The Black Clover manga and anime series features an extensive cast of fictional characters created by Yūki Tabata. Black Clover focusses on Asta’s journey on becoming a wizard king in a world where everyone has magic, whereas Asta has none.

Main characters

Asta

 is an orphan who was left under the care of a church by his mother during his infancy. He has high aspirations of becoming the next Wizard King. He possesses no magical power, but he overcame his weakness by increasing his physical strength, which allowed him to join the Magic Knight Squad known as the Black Bulls after acquiring a five-leaf clover grimoire where the Anti-Magic devil Liebe resides. The grimoire allows him to use Anti-Magic effectively due to his lack of mana. He also embraces Yami's quote  as his personal philosophy in battle. Asta originally used the magic-nullifying Demon-Slayer Sword in the Magic Knights Entrance Exam as well as the Saussy Village mission where he battles Heath Grice with Noelle and Magna. During the Dungeon arc, he, Noelle, and Luck are exploring a dungeon when Luck goes off on his own. He and Noelle are later caught in a trap spell when they run into Yuno, Klaus, and Mimosa. He and Noelle later help Luck in battling Lotus. He, Noelle, and Luck later help Yuno, Klaus, and Mimosa battle Mars where he acquires the magic-siphoning Demon-Dweller Sword. During the Eye of the Midnight Sun's invasion of the royal capital, he battles Rades, Valtos, and other minions with Noelle, Leopold, and Fuegoleon until he is captured by Sally and saved by Julius. He later goes to a mixer with Luck and Finral and meets Rebecca who develops a crush on him. During the Nean Village arc, he goes to Nean to play with Rebecca's siblings and later Marie but this angers Gauche to the point of trying to kill him. He later helps rescue the children that were kidnapped by Neige and Baro with Gauche and Sister Theresa. He later confronts Sally when she turns Baro into a giant mud monster and defeats them with Gauche's help. However, he struggles against Patry(going by Licht at the time) and is almost killed until Yami saves him. Yami teaches him how to sense their ki and he uses it to defeat Valtos. When Patry tries to use his most powerful spell to take him and Yami out, he is saved by Gauche who reflects the spell back at him. He watches as Yami struggles against the Third Eye until he is saved by Jack, Nozel, and Charlotte. He does more damage to Patry with an attack with Yami and Finral. He later stops Gueldre from escaping the captains meeting when it was revealed that Gueldre worked with the Eye of the Midnight Sun. During the Underwater Temple arc he participates in the game set up by Gifso and battles Kiato but are interrupted by Vetto. They battle Vetto who defeats Kiato and he defeats Vetto with help from Vanessa and Finral but at the cost of his arms being infected with curse magic. During the Kiten arc, he defeats Yagos with Finral's help when Langris failed to kill him. He later travels to the Forest of Witches with Noelle, Finral, Vanessa, Fanzell, Dominante, and Mariella to have the Queen of Witches heal his arms. After the Witch Queen used her magic to increase the Anti-Magic flow in Asta's body, he gained the ability to transform into a form called "Black Asta" by tapping into the power of the devil within his grimoire which he uses to defeat Fana and the Diamond Kingdom when they invade. He is later forced by the Queen to kill all his friends until he is stopped by Vanessa's fate-altering ability. He later takes the Royal Knights selection exam and confronts Langris when he gravely injuries Finral. He is accepted into the Royal Knights and raids the Eye of the Midnight Sun's hideout later acquiring the Demon-Destroyer Sword that allows him to destroy magic's actual effects, even after the spell has been cast from Licht after he and Yuno battled him. This allows him to exorcise the elf spirits, should he inflict enough damage to their host bodies using it. Asta later learns that his weapons and grimoire once belonged to the Elf Race's leader Licht, the book itself revealed to have demonic origins as its creation was engineered by the devil Zagred with another devil sealed within it.  He helps the Black Bulls defeat the reincarnated elves. When he enters the Shadow Palace, he finds out about how the elves were manipulated and turns Patry back to normal after he turned into a Dark Elf. Asta also learns about the existence of devils when he battles Zagred in the Shadow Palace alongside Yuno, Secre, Patry, Lumiere, and Licht. He defeats Zagred by slicing his heart in half when Secre seals away his physical damage which allows him to draw out more power. However, Asta later learns his "Black Asta" form subjects him to a curse mark known as  that makes him a target for the Magic Parliament, who see him as a monster that needs to be destroyed. At Julius' request, he later travels to Heart Kingdom, where he stays for six months to train and prepare for the fight against the Spade Kingdom. When Dante Zogratis invades their hideout, he battles him but struggles against him even with the help of Vanessa, Grey, Gauche, and Henry until Yami arrives. When Asta and Yami are fighting, he makes a deal with Liebe and  his right arm becomes permanently corrupted with his Devil's power. With his new arm, he coats Yami's katana with Anti Magic, and it becomes the Demon-Slasher Katana. He later masters Devil Union with Liebe from training with Nacht and defeats the ancient demon threatening the Clover Kingdom. He travels to the Spade Kingdom with the rest of the Black Bulls and battles the Dark Triad and the devils including Lucifero. A year later after the battle, he battles Lucius Zogratis and is sent to the Land of the Sun by Sister Lily who was turned into a Paladin by Lucius where he trains to master Zetten with the Ruyzen Seven.

Yuno Grinberryall

 is the rival of Asta. He is an orphan who turns out to be a prince from the Spade Kingdom's former royal family House Grinberryall, which is based on celestial bodies similar to  Sun Magic and Moon Magic. He was left under the care of a church during his infancy when his parents were killed by the Dark Triad, acquiring a four-leaf clover grimoire and became a member of the Golden Dawn. He uses Wind Magic and is the chosen partner of Sylph the Wind Spirit of the 4 great attributes. Sylph (nicknamed "Bell") often tries to play around with Yuno, but due to his serious demeanor, he is often found complaining. His serious attitude came about when Asta was injured defending him from bullies as a child. Yuno could only admire how Asta saved him, despite not having magic, and it made him feel ashamed. To make up for this, he trained himself to become Asta's equal in a moral sense. His usual cool and quiet demeanor is only broken when he is enjoying himself, usually when fighting someone strong or watching Asta prove his strength. He has proven himself to be a rising star among the ranks of Golden Dawn, capable of beating even the strongest mages with little to no effort. During the Dunegon arc, he, Klaus, and Mimosa were exploring the dunegon saving Asta and Noelle from a trap spell. Later he, Klaus, and Mimosa were struggling against Mars until they were saved by Asta, Noelle, and Luck. He acquires Sylph from looking at a scroll in the treasure room while trying to save Asta from Mars. During the Eye of the Midnight Sun's invasion of the royal capital, he battles zombies with a team of Golden Dawn members until he evades the spatial spell that sucks everyone away. He later battles Catherine and saves Charmy's food. During the Kiten arc, he battles Ragus and kills him. He laters takes the Royal Knights selection exam and is accepted into the Royal Knights. While raiding the Eye of the Midnight Sun's hideout, he is turned into an elf by Patry’s ritual, but he retains his mind and will unlike the other affected humans. He and Asta battle Licht soon after but they are defeated. When he enters the Shadow Palace, he finds out about the elves being manipulated and helps Asta turn Patry back to normal. Yuno later learns about the existence of devils when he battles Zagred in the Shadow Palace with Asta, Secre, Patry, Lumiere, and Licht. He creates an opening for Asta to defeat Zagred. Yuno is cryptically revealed to be the reincarnation of Licht’s unborn son. Yuno later becomes vice captain of the Golden Dawn and learns of his Spade Kingdom heritage while surviving his encounter with Zenon when he invades their headquarters, devastated over failing to protect his fallen comrades and their captured captain. He participates in the invasion of the Spade Kingdom and battles Zenon again alongside Langris. During his second fight with Zenon, Yuno learns the elf soul within his body is the source of his Wind Magic while acquiring a second grimoire that allows him to use Star Magic. He later assists in the battle against Lucifero. After Lucifero is defeated, he reunites with his mother but chooses to remain in the Clover Kingdom to complete the vow he made with Asta. A year after the Spade Kingdom battle, he hears about what happened to Asta and vows to take Lucius down

Noelle Silva

 is a silver-haired member of the Black Bulls and the fourth-born child of the Clover Kingdom's royal family, House Silva. While incredibly powerful as a royal, possessing a vast amount of mana, Noelle initially had trouble controlling her Water Magic with her older brother Nozel acting resentful to her as his way of protecting her from both harm and the truth behind the death of their mother Acier. Noelle uses a wand as a means to cope with this magic but eventually her training and the positive feedback from her new friends in the Black Bulls allow her to overcome that flaw. She harbors strong romantic feelings for Asta, though she is reluctant to express it. During the Saussy Village arc, she helps protect the citizens from Heath's attack with a new spell she learned. During the Dungeon arc, she, Asta, and Luck are exploring a dungeon when Luck goes off on his own. She and Asta are later caught in a trap spell when they run into Yuno, Klaus, and Mimosa. She and Asta later help Luck in battling Lotus. She, Asta, and Luck later help Yuno, Klaus, and Mimosa in their battle against Mars. During the Eye of the Midnight Sun's invasion of the royal capital, she helps Asta, Leopold, and Fuegoleon battle Rades, Valtos, and other minions. When she hears about Asta going to a mixer, she disguises herself as a waitress to make sure Asta doesn't fall in love with anyone. During the Nean Village arc, she follows Asta when he travels to Nean Village. She later tries to go with Asta, Gauche, and Sister Theresa to save the kidnapped children, but is told to stay in case the village is attacked. She later informs the Magic Knights of what is taking place. During the Underwater Temple arc, she trains her magic to get her squad across the ocean with Kahono helping her. She later participates in the game set up by Gifso and battles Kahono. She learns from Kahono that she has been unconsciously holding herself back out of fear of hurting anyone but is interrupted by Vetto. They battle Vetto who defeats Kahono and Noelle overcomes her flaw by doing big damage to Vetto with a new spell she learned. She later travels to the Forest of Witches with Asta, Finral, Vanessa, Fanzell, Dominante, and Mariella to have the Queen of Witches heal Asta's arms. She helps her squad with defeating Fana and the Diamond Kingdom in the Forest of Witches. She takes the Royal Knights selection exam and displays her growth by defeating her brother Solid in a one-on-one battle. She is accepted into the Royal Knights and raids the Eye of the Midnight Sun's hideout but is unable to stop the elf reincarnation. She displays her full potential when fighting the elf Kivin and gains the ability to create water-based armor that increases her offense and defense. She laters enters the Shadow Palace but gets lost and battles Fana alongside Jack. Noelle, wanting to help Asta with his trial, would later learn the truth of her mother's death being caused by a devil named Megicula from Dorothy. She travels to the Heart Kingdom to train for six months to prepare for the battle with Megicula. She first battles Vanica and Megicula in the Heart Kingdom with Secre and Lolopechka and is almost killed but is saved by Patry, Rhya, Vetto, and Fana. She later trains with them to master Saint Sage with the water spirit Undine. She later battles Megicula again in the Spade Kingdom and kills her with the help of her brother Nozel. A year after the Spade Kingdom battle, she tries to help Asta with his battle against Lucius with Mimosa and Secre but gets trapped by Sister Lily and watches in horror as Asta is seemingly killed.

Liebe

 is a devil who resides within Licht's five-leaf grimoire before Asta acquired it, being the source behind Asta's Anti-Magic. Originally from the underworld, Liebe's lack of magic made him the lowest ranking among his kind while being constantly tormented. But Liebe's lack of magic allowed him to freely enter the human world and getting taken in by Asta's mother Licita, who adopted him. But Lucifero partially took over Liebe's body in an attempt to manifest in the living world. Licita getting fatally wounded when she uses her magic-draining body to stop Lucifero and using her final moments to seal Liebe within the five-leaf grimoire to protect him from further possession. The death of his adopted mother fuels his hatred for all devils, and motivates him to try to claim Asta's body to slaughter them all. During the Forest of Witches arc, he allows Asta to tap into some of his power to defeat Ladros. After the battle with Zagred, he mocks Zagred before he disintegrates. During Asta's and Yami's fight with Dante, he takes Asta's right arm in exchange for giving him some power. After being defeated by Asta, he forms a contract in which he agrees to become his friend, and fight the devils together. During Liebe and Asta's fight with Lucifero, Liebe's memories of Licita are shared with Asta. Realizing that Liebe is his half-brother, Asta reassures him of his strength as the two manage to defeat Lucifero. Following the battle, Liebe promises to help Asta's goal in becoming the Wizard King.

Clover Kingdom

Wizard King

Lumiere Silvamillion Clover

 was a human prince from the first days of the Clover Kingdom who wanted to make life better for everyone in making Magic Tools and befriends Licht as both desired co-existence between their peoples. On the day of his sister's secret marriage to Licht, Lumiere was subdued by the Zagred-possessed prime minister after sending the manipulated royals to slaughter the elves and force Licht into becoming a Dark Elf to serve as a temporary vessel. Lumiere arrives in time as Licht begs Lumiere to kill him, after cursing his body so Zagred cannot use it. Lumiere is named the 1st Wizard King soon after. Severely injured after his battle with the monstrous Licht, Lumiere has Secre petrify him, so he can be revived by her should Zagred resurface. He battles Zagred again in the Shadow Palace with Secre, Asta, Yuno, Patry, and Licht. Once Zagred is defeated and the elf souls allowed to rest in peace, Lumiere joins them in the afterlife as the magic that kept him alive wears off, and is content that his ideals live on in the new generation.

Julius Novachrono

 is the 28th Wizard King and user of Time Magic, his obsession with new and strange forms of magic having him shirk from his duties on his free time. Julius was previously the Magic Knight Captain of the Aqua Deer Squad when they were previously the Grey Deer Squad; Yami and Vangeance both being members whom Julius personally recruited into the Magic Knights. After the Saussy Village arc, he wanders the city as an old lady and is amazed by Asta's anti-magic. After the Eye of the Midnight Sun's invasion of the royal capital, he saves Asta after he is captured by the Eye of the Midnight Sun. He later sends the Black Bulls to the Underwater Temple to secure the magic stone. Although he is killed by Patry to acquire the Magic Stones that he had Yami and the Black Bulls secure, he eventually revived himself through an ancient magic tool that he previously stored 13 years' worth of time in. This process revived Julius as a 13-year-old boy with his powers reduced, rendering him unable to carry out part of his duties as Wizard King. He forgives William for his role in Party's actions as he feels he was somewhat responsible. Despite his condition, he continues to work to support the Magic Knights, while keeping his age a secret from the public. During the invasion of the Spade Kingdom, he asks Damnatio to help him battle the ancient demon that is threatening the Clover Kingdom. They both struggle against it until they are saved by Asta. Lucius reestablishes himself as the dominant soul, putting Julius's soul to sleep for the time being, no longer needing him.

Wizard King Advisors

Marx Francois

 is a Magic Knight and one of Julius' advisers. He uses Memory magic to gather information from individuals, such as spies. Marx tries to get Julius to focus on his duties as the Wizard King, but becomes frustrated whenever he slacks off to observe more magic. During the Elf attack, he becomes possessed by an Elf spirit along with Owen. He and Owen briefly battle Yami but they are defeated and later exorcised. After Zagred is defeated, he resumes his duties.

Owen

 is a Magic Knight and Julius's right hand who is the best healer in the Clover Kingdom, possessing Water Healing magic that allows him to reattach severed arms or emulate X-rays. After the fight in the Underwater Sea Temple, he tells Asta that he won't be able to use his arms, infected by the Ancient Curse magic, as his bones are turning to dust. After Patry completes the reincarnation ritual, Owen ends up being possessed by an Elf spirit with his magic inverted to destroy rather than heal. He and Marx briefly battle Yami but they are defeated and later exorcised. After Zagred is defeated, he resumes his duties.

House of Kira
One of the three royal houses alongside Houses Vermilion and Silva, 's lineage dates back to the foundation of the Clover Kingdom and genocide of the Elves.

Augustus Kira Clover XIII

, the current King Clover and member of House Kira, is an arrogant and petty person who thinks that being noble is everything and has nothing but contempt for commoners. He is extremely envious that the people fail to acknowledge him when compared to the Wizard King. Augustus's need to be recognized motivated his decision to take credit for the Royal Knights which Julius actually devised. While extremely powerful as a member of royalty through his use of light magic, Augustus's overconfidence that his position alone made him superior to potential opponents convinced him to not hone his skills. Thus a majority of his spells are mostly showy displays of power meant to impress others, though they usually have the opposite effect and are easily dispatched. He later makes Sekke Bronzazza his personal attendant after Sekke "saves" him from a Coral Peacock possessed Magic Knight. He then tasks Sekke to join the captains in the invasion of the Spade Kingdom.

Damnatio Kira

 is a member of House Kira who is chairman of the Clover Kingdom's Magic Parliament, a manipulative and ruthless man who places justice above even his own family. He is also a user of Scale Magic, making him able to shrink and counter all forms of magic save Anti-Magic. Following the elf incident, after dispatching anti-monarchist nobles who attempted to kill Augustus in the confusion, Damnatio oversees Asta's trial for using forbidden magic before the Black Bulls intervene with Julius passing a decree for a Black Bull mission outside the Clover Kingdom to hinder Damantio's inquisition. Damnatio allows this, but vows to place every Magic Knight through an inquisition should Asta's mission fails and threatens the Clover Kingdom in any way. He is later asked by Julius to help defend the Clover Kingdom from an ancient demon. They both struggle against it until they are saved by Asta. During the Black Bulls’ battle against the Dark Triad, Damnatio conducted his own investigation on the Devils and realized an inconsistency that links Julius to the unaccounted devil Astaroth. Damnatio confronts Julius about this, only for Lucius Zogratis to manifest in Julius and incapacitates him before he could use his Scale Magic.

Black Bull Squad

Yami Sukehiro

Despite this aggression, he serves as a mentor to the Black Bulls, wanting them to be as strong as possible. A running gag involves him suffering from constipation and threatening anyone who disturbs him on the toilet, usually Asta or Finral. He taught his subordinates, especially Asta, to surpass their limits if they feel like they are at their limit while fighting. After supposedly murdering his family, sparing his younger sister Ichika, Yami fled his homeland and reached the Clover Kingdom where he joined the Magic Knights at Julius Novachrono's behest despite being looked down as a foreigner by his peers. Yami uses Dark Magic, using it to enchant his katana since his type of magic is regarded as Light Magic's polar opposite due to its slowness. His Dark Magic can also interfere with magic from the underworld, making him a valuable asset. He also possesses a sixth sense which allows him to sense his opponent's ki to predict their attack and counter, enabling him to learn of the connection between Patry and William. During the Nean Village arc, He wakes up Finral and gets him to take him to the cave to help so he battles Patry while Asta battles Valtos. During the battle, he teaches Asta how to detect ki. He is later saved by Gauche when he comes back to reflect Patry's most powerful spell back at him. He later struggles against the Third Eye until he is saved by Jack, Nozel, and Charlotte. He later does some more damage to Patry with an attack with Asta and Finral. During the Underwater Temple arc, he is barred by Gifso from playing the game he set up for the Black Bulls. When he sees his squad risking their lives against Vetto, he learns a new spell and uses it to kill Vetto. During the Kiten arc, he saves William from being killed by Lotus. During the raid of the Eye of the Midnight Sun's hideout, he is asked by William to come over to the Golden Dawn's headquarters assuming that William is apologizing for Langris's behavior. He later realizes it was a trick and arrives too late as Patry kills Julius. During the elf reincarnation arc, he easily defeats the possessed Marx and Owen. Then he briefly battles Charla(the elf that possessed Charlotte) with Sol. Later, he defends the king from the possessed Langris with Finral and Jack. He later enters the Shadow Palace with Jack and helps Licht and Charla battle Zagred before he gets seperated with Charla. He later helps Asta defeat Zagred and captures Gueldre and Revchi when he notices that they are in the Shadow Palace. He is later targeted by the Dark Triad for his Dark Magic, needed to create a Tree of Qliphoth. Though he and Asta manage to defeat Dante, he is captured and taken by Zenon, with his katana left in Asta's possession. After he is freed by Asta and Yuno, he assists in the battle against Lucifero. He was near death until he was saved by Mimosa. A year later after the Spade Kingdom battle, he vows to fight Lucius after hearing what happened to Asta.

Finral Roulacase

 is a member of the Black Bulls. He uses Spatial Magic primarily for transport, and is a womanizer and a coward, but has recently started becoming braver. For most of his life, he was considered by his father and stepmother as inferior to his younger brother, Langris Vaude, due to Finral not possessing offensive Spatial magic spells. Unable to handle the responsibility of becoming the head of House Vaude, Finral leaves home and adopts Roulacase, his deceased mother's name, as his surname. This lack of responsibility led to his carefree and cowardly personality, and a fear of responsibility. Langris eventually becomes the Vice Captain of Golden Dawn, the squad deemed to the strongest, and looks down on Finral and the Black Bulls. After the invasion of the royal capital he sets up a mixer with Asta and Luck. During the Nean Village arc, he is woken up by Yami and forced to take him to help Asta against Patry and Valtos. He then takes Gauche, Sister Theresa, and the kidnapped children back to the village. He later takes Gauche back to the cave so he could save Asta and Yami from Patry. He watches as Yami struggles against the Third Eye until he is saved by Jack, Nozel, and Charlotte. He creates an opening for Asta and Yami to do more damage on Patry. During the Underwater Temple  arc, Finral eventually starts helping out his comrades in combat, primarily using his power to trick their opponents and conduct surprise attacks, and his ability to manipulate and change the spatial location of his comrades as he wishes proves crucial in several battles against powerful opponents especially with helping Asta against Vetto with Vanessa. During the Kiten arc, he helps Asta defeat Yagos when Langris fails to kill him. He later travels to the Forest of Witches with Asta, Noelle, Vanessa, Fanzell, Dominante, and Mariella to have the Queen of Witches heal Asta's arms and helps his squad defeat Fana and the Diamond Kingdom. Finral was gravely injured during the Royal Knight Selection Exam by Langris, and he was saved from being killed by the Black Bulls. Upon awakening, he aids Yami and Jack the Ripper during their battle against Latry, the elf possessing Langris, and manages to partially reconcile with him. He is later woken up by Nero(Secre) who takes him to collect the magic stones and revive the first Wizard King. Finral decides to accept responsibility and become the head of House Vaude, and works hard to overcome his womanizing urges to become a proper husband to Finnes Calmreich, the betrothed to the next head of House of Vaude. He takes Yami back to the hideout to help Asta in his battle against Dante. He later goes to assist in the Spade Kingdom battle. He saves Langris when he sees him struggling against Zenon. They work together and damage him, but they fail to kill him until they are saved by Yuno. A year after the Spade Kingdom battle, he hears about what happened to Asta but doesn't believe that he is dead and decides to search for him with the squad.

Magna Swing

 is a member of the Black Bulls and is depicted as Yami's right-hand guy. Magna is a good-natured yet hot-headed delinquent who uses Fire Magic and rides his personalized broom, which he calls "Crazy Cyclone". Though his inherent-mana is low, he makes up for this weakness by launching several low-magic fireballs with varying effects. Magna was originally a commoner from Rayaka Village near the Clover Kingdom border, abusing his power in antagonizing the nearby village of Sosshi. He frequently fought against the village elder, sharpening his skills, before becoming his disciple, who influenced his choice to join the Magic Knights. He acts as a senior to Asta and Noelle, accompanying them on some of their missions like Saussy Village where he helps them battle Heath Grice. During the Underwater Temple arc, he and Luck participate in the game set up by Gifso and battle Gio before they are interrupted by Vetto. They battle Vetto but lose. He later takes the Royal Knights selection exam but is not accepted into the Royal Knights. He later fights the possessed Luck with Asta and Vanessa. The relationship between Magna and Luck proves key in freeing Luck from Rufel's possession, and they fight alongside the Black Bulls against the reincarnated elves. He is later transported to the Dream World by Reve with Luck, Vanessa, Charmy, and Sally. They later escape the Dream World with Sally's help and he and Luck defeat Reve in the real world. Feeling that he is not becoming strong enough in comparison to Luck and Asta, he studies rune arrays under Zora to further his magic techniques. He eventually crafts an array that equally splits his and his opponent's magic, allowing him to singlehandedly defeat Dante Zogratis of the Dark Triad. A year after the Spade Kingdom battle, he hears about what happened to Asta but doesn't believe that he is dead and decides to search for him with the squad.

Luck Voltia

 is a member of the Black Bulls, a borderline psychopath who uses Lightning Magic and is always smiling regardless of circumstances, giving him the nickname "Luck the Cheery Berserker." He fights by creating gloves and boots to increase his speed and launch lightning balls. Born a commoner within Yvon Village and raised by a troubled woman before she died of stress, Luck was instilled with the notion that winning a fight is the same as being loved. This motivated him to fight stronger opponents to test his strength, joining the Magic Knights while gaining infamy from his conduct of nearly killing an opponent in the entrance exams. He and Magna have a good-natured rivalry, which involves Luck stealing Magna’s pudding to get Magna to fight him. During the Dungeon arc, he, Asta, and Noelle are exploring the dungeon but he goes off on his own to battle Lotus. He struggles against Lotus until he is saved by Asta and Noelle. He later helps them along with Yuno, Klaus, and Mimosa battle Mars. After the invasion of the royal capital, he goes to a mixer with Asta and Finral. During the Underwater Temple arc, he and Magna participate in the game set up by Gifso and battle Gio before they are interrupted by Vetto. They battle Vetto but they lose. He later takes the Royal Knights selection exam and is accepted into the Royal Knights. Later, during the raid of the Midnight Sun's base, Luck ends up being possessed by the elf spirit  as a result of Patry's ritual. Luck is released from the spell after Rufel is defeated by Magna and Vanessa with Asta exorcizing the elf spirit while giving Rufel closure. He later helps his squad in defeating the reincarnated elves before he is transported to the Dream World by Reve with Magna, Vanessa, Charmy, and Sally. They later escape the Dream World with Sally's help and he and Magna defeat Reve in the real world. He later goes to the Heart Kingdom to train for six months and battles Svenkin but is almost killed. He is later saved by Patry, Rhya, Vetto, and Fana. He trains with them and learns Ultimate Lightning Magic. He later goes to assist in the Spade Kingdom battle. A year after the Spade Kingdom battle, he hears about what happened to Asta but doesn't believe that he is dead and decides to search for him with the squad.

Gauche Adlai

 is a member of the Black Bulls who uses Mirror Magic, augmented by the small mirror in place of his left eye, that allows him to create mirror clones of himself or another. Gauche was originally a noble years prior when his parents died in an "accident" and then both he and his little sister Marie were robbed of their inheritance by another noble who cast them into the street. Gauche's devotion to Marie, which bordered on an unhealthy obsession that gave him a sister complex, motivated him to provide for her through criminal acts until he was arrested and Marie placed in an orphanage. Gauche was later recruited by Yami while attempting to escape prison and reach the orphanage. Alhough Gauche initially doesn't get along with the squad, Gauche eventually starts to open up to the squad after seeing Asta's determination to work as a team. During the Nean Village arc, he visits Marie for her birthday, but starts making attempts on Asta's life when Marie develops a crush on Asta. When the children were kidnapped including Marie by Neige and Baro, he goes with Asta and Sister Theresa to save them. When Sally turns Baro into a giant mud monster, Gauche tries to take Marie back to the village but she convinces him to go back and help. He helps Asta defeat Baro along with Sally. However, he is injured by Patry when he shows up. He is later taken back to the village by Finral to have his injuries healed. After getting extra magic from Sister Theresa and Neige, he has Finral take him back to the cave to save Asta and Yami from Patry. He watches as Yami struggles against the Third Eye until he is saved by Jack, Nozel, and Charlotte. After the battle, he starts showing Sister Theresa more respect. During the Underwater Temple arc, he participates in the game set up by Gifso and battles an Eye of the Midnight Sun minion with Grey's help. During the raid on the Eye of the Midnight Sun's hideout, he battles Rades, Valtos, and Sally with Gordon, Grey, and Henry. Following the Midnight Sun's attack on the Black Bulls' base, Gauche ends up being possessed by the Elf  of the Apostles of Sephirah before Asta exorcises the elf spirit with the help of Gordon, Grey, and Henry and Drowa accepts the Black Bulls to be nothing like the barbarous humans who killed him and his sister Eclat long ago. Having spent the duration of the possession reconsidering his view on people, Gauche truly considers his teammates friends. He helps Asta in his battle against Dante alongside Vanessa, Grey, and Henry. He is almost killed in the battle against Dante but is healed by Grey. He later goes to assist in the Spade Kingdom battle. A year after the Spade Kingdom battle, he hears about what happened to Asta but doesn't believe that he is dead and decides to search for him with the squad.

Charmy Pappitson

 is a member of the Black Bulls who eats constantly and often has food on her mind, being an adult despite her childlike appearance. While she uses Cotton Magic to usually create sheep that cook her meals, Charmy's magic has been seen to be extremely powerful as it has helped the squad out of more than one difficult situation, using a powerful binding spell, creating a giant sheep monster, and restoring people's magic, the only known spell that does so. During the Eye of the Midnight Sun's invasion of the royal capital, she defeats Catherine when she mistakenly believed that she was trying to steal her food. She develops a crush on Yuno after he saved her food during the attack on the capital. During the Underwater Temple arc, she participates in the game set up by Gifso and saves Gauche and Grey when they are trapped by an Eye of the Midnight Sun minion. During the Kiten arc, she helps evacuate the citizens. During the elf reincarnation arc, she helps her squad in defeating the reincarnated elves before she is transported to the Dream World by Reve with Magna, Luck, Vanessa, and Sally. They later escape the Dream World with Sally's help. She later enters the Shadow Palace and battles Lira. During the battle against Lira, Charmy learns she is of Dwarf descent as she found herself able to assume a more adult-like appearance with her sheep turned into wolves to use with her mana-absorbing Food Magic. She later travels to the Heart Kingdom to train for six months and battles Halbet but is almost killed. She is later saved by Patry, Rhya, Vetto, and Fana. She trains with them and learns Ultimate Cotton Magic. She later goes to assist in the Spade Kingdom battle. A year after the Spade Kingdom battle, she hears about what happened to Asta but doesn't believe that he is dead and decides to search for him with the squad.

Vanessa Enoteca

 is a very laidback pink-haired witch of the Black Bulls. During Vanessa's childhood, she is estranged from her mother, the Queen of the Witches, when she tried awaken Vanessa's ability to alter a person's destiny by keeping her in captivity for most of her life. After being freed by Yami, she joins the Black Bulls to forge her own path. Her Thread Magic grants her the ability to create threads too thin to be detectable to even magic, letting her manipulate people and objects on the battlefield. During the Underwater Temple arc, she participates in the game set up by Gifso and helps Asta and Finral battle Vetto. When Asta's arms are infected with curse magic following the Underwater Temple arc, she goes back to her homeland with Asta, Noelle, Finral, Fanzell, Dominante, and Mariella to have her mother heal Asta's arms. She helps her squadmates with defeating Fana and the Diamond Kingdom. Eventually, the Queen betrays them and forces Asta to kill her friends, Vanessa then awakens her fate-altering ability, the Red Thread of Fate, in the form of a cat familiar which she names Rouge; it is powerful enough to negate any outcome that Vanessa does not desire, such as the deaths of her teammates. This ability defends the Black Bulls from being harmed while Rouge is active. She later helps Magna and Asta free Luck from Rufel. She then helps her squad in defeating the reincarnated elves before she is transported to the Dream World by Reve with Magna, Luck, Charmy, and Sally. They later ecsape the Dream world with Sally's help. She helps Asta in his battle against Dante alongside Gauche, Grey, and Henry. She later goes to assist in the Spade Kingdom battle. A year after the Spade Kingdom battle, she hears about what happened to Asta but doesn't believe that he is dead and decides to search for him with the squad.

Grey

 is a shy blue-haired girl who joined the Black Bulls after she being driven from home by her abusive stepmother and older twin stepsisters, developing feelings for Gauche. Initially using what was thought to be Transformation Magic to assume the appearance of others, initially posing as a mysterious and massive shadowy man. During the Underwater Temple arc, she participates in the game set up by Gifso and helps Gauche battle a minion before being forced to reveal her true form due to her running low on magic. Grey later learns she can also transform magic into other attributes. During the raid on the Eye of the Midnight Sun's hideout, she helps Gordon, Gauche, and Henry battle Rades, Valtos, and Sally when they invade their hideout. She later helps her squad in defeating the reincarnated elves. She also helps Asta free Gauche from Dorwa alongside Gordon and Henry. She later helps Asta in his battle against Dante alongside Vanessa, Gauche, and Henry. After Grey’s attempt to heal Gauche in the aftermath of Dante's attack on the Black Bulls hideout, she learns that she actually utilizes Transmutation Magic, which allows her to alter all forms of matter. She later goes to assist in the Spade Kingdom battle. A year after the Spade Kingdom battle, she hears about what happened to Asta but doesn't believe that he is dead and decides to search for him with the squad.

Gordon Agrippa
 
 is a member of the Black Bulls, who is very friendly and cherishes his comrades despite being misunderstood because of his pale and creepy appearance along with his whispering most of the time. An expert in Poison Magic and curses, Gordon comes from a commoner family that specializes in curse magic that their ancestors used for murderous purposes. Because of this, he rarely interacted with anyone during his childhood, leading him to develop poor communication skills. He was further rejected during adulthood due to his Poison Magic, further increasing his desire for friends. During the raid on the Eye of the Midnight Sun's hideout, he battles Rades, Valtos, and Sally with Gauche, Grey, and Henry when they attack their hideout. He later helps his squad in defeating the reincarnated elves. He also helps Asta free Gauche from Drowa alongside Grey and Henry. He eventually starts speaking up more with his squad mates, who accept him wholeheartedly. Gordon initially wanted nothing to do with his family since their legacy caused his childhood isolation, only to learn later that his father Nathan became a healer who uses their family's knowledge to locate and treat those who are cursed, which Gordon was unaware of due to his father being a poor communicator too. During the timeskip, he learns how to turn curses into medicine with his posion magic. He later goes to assist in the Spade Kingdom battle. A year after the Spade Kingdom battle, he hears about what happened to Asta but doesn't believe that he is dead and decides to search for him with the squad.

Zora Ideale

 is a cynical and often disrespectful member of the Black Bulls who uses his versatile Ash Magic in creating various trap spells against his opponents, his most often used spell being one that rebounds an opponents spell at double the strength. He is harshly critical toward those he defeats. Zora's ideology developed as the result of the death of his father Zara, who looked up to Magic Knights and eventually joined the Purple Orcas as the first commoner Magic Knight. Zara was secretly killed by a teammate during a mission because of this. This disillusioned Zora, giving him a hatred of nobility and royalty, and made it his goal to put every corrupt Magic Knight in his place, refusing to wear his Magic Knight robe after Yami made him a member after defeating him in a battle. He infiltrates the Royal Knights Selection Exam under a false identity for his personal agenda, and constantly argues with Asta due to their drastically different personalities and worldviews. After witnessing his bravery, sense of justice and desire to work with others, Zora is inspired to work with others as well, and decides to officially declare himself as a Black Bull member. Though he still retains some of his arrogance and continues to argue with Asta, he joins the Royal Knights and fights alongside his squad against the Eye of the Midnight Sun. He  saves Mereoleona with Asta when she struggled in her battle against the elves. He later helps Nozel and Noelle defend the Sliva residence from reincarnated elves. During the timeskip, he helps Magna in developing rune arrays. He later goes to assist in the Spade Kingdom battle. A year after the Spade Kingdom battle, he hears about what happened to Asta but doesn't believe that he is dead and decides to search for him with the squad.

Henry Legolant

 is the actual owner of the Black Bulls' base, using his Recombination Magic to remodel the building and rooms as he seems fit, having a tendency to talk very slowly. While from a noble family, Henry's parents were forced to move into the Common Region as their son was born with a curse-based illness that requires him to passively siphon mana from others to live. Henry assumed his death was certain after his parents eventually left him, only to be found by Yami who convinces him to survive as he intends to fill his house with many healthy and active people to siphon mana from. Henry since expressed a sense of obligation to the Black Bulls, though the others assumed he was ghost since he secretly wanders the base to witness his squad mates' camaraderie with Asta the only other Black Bull member aware of him. Revealing himself during the Eye of the Midnight Sun's attack on the base, Henry proves key during the battle by configuring the base into a bull-shaped form, using the mana he accumulated from the Black Bulls to pilot the base and use powerful attacks. His sense of obligation motivated him to help the others battle Drowa, and an attempt to sacrifice himself to save them, but is rescued by his friends, and is glad he can fulfill his desire to openly live with them. He later helps Asta in his battle against Dante alongside Vanessa, Grey, and Gauche. He later goes to assist in the Spade Kingdom battle. A year after the Spade Kingdom battle, he hears about what happened to Asta but doesn't believe that he is dead and decides to search for him with the squad.

Secre Swallowtail

 nero black clover is a young woman who lived five centuries ago in the Clover Kingdom as a servant of Wizard King Lumiere. She helped him perfect his magic tools with her Sealing Magic. Secre afflicted herself with the Weg curse after she sealed the devil Zagred away from the world of the living with the magic stones as a power source, causing her to grow horns as a drawback of this Forbidden Magic. This act altered the very nature her magic, and she gained the ability to transform into the form of an anti-bird after sealing the Prince as a stone, as a fail-safe measure, should Zagred return once again. Secre remained in her bird form for centuries before deciding to stay near Asta after encountering him during his Magic Knights Entrance Exam. She continued to be with Asta even after he was included as a member in the Black Bulls. Upon seeing her, the other Black Bull members named her . While she was with the Black Bulls as their pet bird, she played a key role in gathering a majority of magic stones for them. When Zagred returns after five centuries, Secre borrows Finral to reach Lumiere so she can use the magic stones to revive him while returning to her true form before they could join Asta and others at the Shadow Palace. She proves to be crucial when she unseals Licht's soul and seals away Asta's physical damage, allowing him to draw even more power, which proved necessary to destroy Zagred. While Secre wanted to remain by Lumiere's side as he passes on, he convinces her to remain with the Black Bulls as an official member. When Secre and Asta are convicted by the Magic Parliament for their involvement with devils, Yami interrupts and proclaims amidst everyone that Secre too was a member of the Black Bulls, and warns everyone to not lay a finger on her, along with Asta. This motivates her to join the Black Bulls, and she supports the other Black Bull members in their mission to investigate devils. She goes to the Heart Kingdom to train for six months and helps with the battle againist Vanica but is almost killed. She is later saved by Patry, Rhya, Vetto, and Fana and trains with them. She later goes to assist in the Spade Kingdom battle. A year after the Spade Kingdom battle, she tries to help Asta with his battle against Lucius with Noelle and Mimosa but gets trapped by Sister Lily and watches in horror as Asta is seemingly killed.

Nacht Faust

 is the enigmatic vice-captain of the Black Bulls, who uses Shadow Magic to manipulate shadows in various ways and mastered the ability to merge with his contracted devils via Devil Union to use their power as his own. In the past, Nacht was a selfish delinquent who became distant from his twin brother Morgen as he joined the Grey Deer Magic Knights Squad, briefly bonding with Yami before ending their friendship. But he overstepped his boundaries when attempting to subjugate a Supreme Devil named Lucifugus, resulting in a concerned Morgen sacrificing himself to save his brother. Devastated that his selfish actions led to his brother's death, Nacht swears to never forgive himself until his own death. Despite his dislike for most Magic Knights, Nacht accepted Yami’s offer to be his vice-captain once the Black Bulls were established, with Julius the only other to know of him. For most of the series, Nacht undergoes a infiltration mission in the Spade Kingdom. He returns to the Clover Kingdom when the Dark Triad declare war to provide his intel and aid in plotting an invasion of the Spade Kingdom. Following Yami’s capture, Nacht trains Asta to utilize Devil Union with Liebe before they join the other Magic Knights to stop the Dark Triad. He then battles Dante with Jack. However, he gets sucked into a battle with the devils Lilith and Naamah and struggles against them until he is saved by Asta. He later restrains them for Asta to kill them. He then participates in the battle against Lucifero. He was near death until he was saved by Mimosa. A year after the Spade Kingdom battle, he tells the rest of the Black Bulls what happened to Asta but he doesn't believe that Asta is dead and decides to search for him with the squad.

Golden Dawn Squad
The  are the strongest order of Magic Knights, at least according to Wizard King Julius' "Star" System of rankings. The selection of most of its members is later revealed to have been part of Patry's plan as the majority of them are reincarnated elves.

William Vangeance

 is the leader of the Golden Dawn and a potential heir to Julius as Wizard King, possessing vast mana and is able to use World Tree Magic. Born as an illegitimate child to an unknown noble, Vangeance suffered a horrific abusive childhood before and after being accepted as an aristocrat. He formed a deep friendship with Patry, who reincarnated into his body, as William's desire to care for the soul inside him gave him a reason to live through his childhood. Julius served as a mentor and friend to William, even making the mask that William wears which he made special for him to conceal the scar he was born with. During the Kiten arc, he uses his magic to defeat the rest of the Diamond Kingdom's soldiers. He is attacked by Lotus but Yami saves him. As Yami had suspicions of them prior due to William and Patry's similarities, William is ultimately suppressed when Patry takes complete control of his host's body through the completed reincarnation ritual. William eventually regains his body when Asta exorcizes Patry at the elf's request so his magic can help Licht calm the other reincarnated elves and allow them to move on the afterlife, allowing him to resume his duties as a Magic Knight after Julius forgives him for his role in Patry's actions. William is later abducted by Zenon Zogratis for the Dark Triad's aim of creating a Tree of Qliphoth. He uses his magic to help heal half of his squad after he was kidnapped. He is later freed from the Tree of Qliphoth by Asta and Yuno then he was saved by Patry.

Langris Vaude

 is the Golden Dawn's former vice-captain and Finral's younger brother, having replaced him as their family's heir due to possessing stronger and more offensive Spatial Magic compared to Finral. This made Langris develop an arrogant attitude towards his brother. However, Langris secretly envies his brother's good-natured personality, noticing people prefer Finral's company to his. Langris feels he must be better than Finral in every aspect, or else he is worthless. During the Kiten arc, he defeats Yagos but fails to kill him until he is saved by Asta and Finral. He later takes the Royal Knights selection exam and almost kills Finral until he is stopped by the rest of the Black Bulls. He and Asta confront each other following that. Langris ends up being possessed by the spirit of Patry's cousin  after Patry completes the ritual to resurrect the elves. Latry storming the palace to take Augustus Kira Clover XIII hostage while subjecting him to torture before Yami, Finral, and Jack arrive to stop the elf which is later exorcised. Langris partially reconciles with Finral, gaining an understanding with him, but insists Finral breaks his womanizing habits if he truly wants to be head of House Vaude, not wanting him to get his happy ending so easily. He later assists Yuno with the battle against Zenon Zogratis in the Spade Kingdom. He struggles against Zenon until he is saved by Finral. They work together and damage him, but they fail to kill him until they are saved by Yuno.

Klaus Lunettes

 is a nobleman and a member of the Golden Dawn, a serious-minded user of Steel Magic. While Klaus initially looked down on Asta and Yuno for being from "the sticks", he ends being on friendly terms with them following their mission in a dungeon and seeing them fight Mars. During the Eye of the Midnight Sun's invasion of the royal capital, he helps his squadmates fight the zombies before being swept up by spatial magic. He later takes the Royal Knights selection exam and is accepted into the Royal Knights. However, during the raid on the Eye of the Midnight Sun's hideout, Klaus ends up later possessed by an elf spirit following Patry's ritual which is later exorcised. He is almost killed when Zenon invades the Golden Dawn's headquarters.

Mimosa Vermillion

 is a royal of Vermillion Family and a member of the Golden Dawn, being Noelle Silva's cousin through the latter's aunt marrying into Vermillion House, who uses Plant Magic, specializing in healing spells. After seeing a child steal bread to feed herself and a younger one, Mimosa learned not to share the superficial and arrogant outlooks of other nobles and royal, and appreciate people according to their worth, specifically having a deep respect for Noelle due to her working harder than any other noble. This leads to her kinder and more gentle personality, though she can be blunt and rude to people she hates. During the Dunegon arc, she, Yuno, and Klaus are exploring the dungeon when they run into Asta and Noelle. She, Yuno, and Klaus later battle Mars and struggle against him until they are saved by Asta, Noelle, and Luck. She also falls deeply in love with Asta, after seeing him fight against all odds despite having no magic. During the Eye of the Midnight Sun's invasion of the royal capital, she heals the citizens that were injured in the battle. She later takes the Royal Knights selection exam and is accepted into the Royal Knights. Her healing magic proves useful during the battle against the reincarnated elves. She goes to the Heart Kingdom to train for six months and she battles Robero but is almost killed. She is later saved by Patry, Rhya, Vetto, and Fana. She trains with them and learns Ultimate Plant Magic. She later goes to assist in the Spade Kingdom battle. A year after the Spade Kingdom battle, she tries to help Asta with his battle against Lucius with Noelle and Secre but gets trapped by Sister Lily and watches in horror as Asta is seemingly killed.

Alecdora Sandler

 is a nobleman and member of the Golden Dawn who uses Sand Magic. He is mostly stoic in nature, having completely devoted himself to William since being saved during a mission and believing that only he can fulfill his captain's dream of becoming Wizard King. This placed him at odds with Yuno whom he considered unworthy of William's favor, and utterly loathes him for wanting to become the next Wizard King. During the Eye of the Midnight Sun's invasion of the royal capital, he helps his squadmates fight off the zombies before being swept up by spatial magic. He later takes the Royal Knights Selection Exam and faces Yuno on opposing teams, with Sandler losing in a one-on-one battle with Yuno. He is not accepted into the Royal Knights. He is almost killed when Zenon invades the Golden Dawn's headquarters.

Hamon Caseus

 Hamon Caseus was a nobleman and a 2nd Class Intermediate Magic Knight of the Clover Kingdom's Golden Dawn and Royal Knights squads. He was a cheerful man who enjoys eating and sharing food with others. He used Glass Magic to generate and manipulate glass. He later takes the Royal Knights selection exam and is accepted into the Royal Knights. He is later possessed by an elf spirit which is later exorcised. He was killed by Zenon's forces when he invaded the Golden Dawn Headquarters.

Crimson Lion Kings Squad
One branch of the family's siblings is known for their red hair, desire for strength, and skill in Fire Magic. The other branch is known for their orange hair, conflicting personalities, and skill in nature-based magic.

Fuegoleon Vermillion

 is a royal of House Vermillion and the captain of the Crimson Lion Kings who uses large-scale, powerful Fire Magic. He does not have the arrogant attitude of most royals, possessing a strong sense of justice and enjoying helping others grow stronger, regardless of status. Before the events of the story, he declared his intent to become Wizard King with many believing him to be powerful enough to also become king of the Clover Kingdom if he wanted. However, targeted by the Eye of the Midnight Sun, Fuegoleon encounters Patry while being teleported to the elf's location after ending Rades' attack on the capital. He was sent back to the city in a comatose state after being critically wounded, with his right arm ripped and the magic stone in his possession taken by Patry. He awakens when his squad is attacked by their possessed vice-captain. He rejoins the Magic Knights during the elves' assault on the capital. Using his magic to create a flame-based artificial limb, Fuegoleon later acquired the Fire Spirit Salamander after it left Fana, making him more powerful. He later enters the Shadow Palace and battles a possessed Kaiser. He later participates in the invasion of the Spade Kingdom and the battle against Lucifero.

Leopold Vermillion

 is a royal of House Vermillion and a member of the Crimson Lions, he is Fuegoleon and Mereoleona's younger brother, who uses Fire Magic as well and has aspirations of becoming Wizard King. He adopts his siblings' ideology of judging people by their strength, personality, and desire to grow, not status. Though he feels inferior to his siblings’ strength, he continues to work hard to create a strength different from theirs. During the Eye of the Midnight Sun's invasion of the royal capital, after seeing Asta's battle prowess, he considers himself his rival and friend, which is later reciprocated by Asta. He later helps Asta, Noelle, and Fuegoleon fight off Rades, Valtos, and other Eye of the Midnight Sun minions. He takes the Royal Knights selection exam but is not accepted into the Royal Knights. He helps defend their hideout when they are attacked by their possessed vice-captain. He later goes to the Heart Kingdom to train for six months and battles Sivoir but is almost killed. He is later saved by Patry, Rhya, Vetto, and Fana. He trains with them and learns Ultimate Flame Magic. He later goes to assist in the Spade Kingdom battle

Mereoleona Vermillion

 is a royal of House Vermillion and Fuegoleon and Leopold's elder sister, taking over for the former following his injuries. She believes strength is everything, and unlike most royals, judges people based on their strength, not status. Known as the "Uncrowned, Undefeated Lioness", she uses Fire Magic, and due to much time spent solo training in the wild, is skilled in using natural mana. She has mastered a technique called , allowing her to manipulate the mana in her surroundings rather than through her body, using powerful punches from anywhere. She is undefeated in combat. Mereoleona is very aggressive, and often uses violence against her own squad. She is also the current commander of the Royal Knights, and serves as a sort of mentor to Asta, due to their fighting styles involving close combat. During the raid on the Eye of the Midnight Sun's hideout, she overpowers Rhya but struggles against 5 elves and is saved by Asta and Zora. She later enters the Shadow Palace and battles Vetto. She later assists in the Spade Kingdom battle by helping the Spade Kingdom resistance battle an ancient demon. She also participates in the battle against Lucifero.

Silver Eagles Squad
The family is known for their silver hair, often arrogant personalities, and skill in water-based magic and steel-based magic.

Nozel Silva

 is a royal of the House of Silva and captain of the Silver Eagles, a childhood rival of Fuegoleon Vermillion, possessing the ability to use Mercury Magic in manipulating liquid metal. Nozel is one of few people who know that his mother Acier was killed by Megicula's curse, hiding the truth from his siblings while acting resentful towards Noelle to prevent her from becoming a Magic Knight and being subjected to all forms of danger from her inability to control her magic. During the Eye of the Midnight Sun's invasion of the royal capital, he helps his family fight off the zombies before being swept up by spatial magic vowing to never mess up again after seeing what happened to Fuegoleon. During the Nean Village arc, he accompanies Charlotte and Jack to help the Black Bulls fend off the Third Eye. During the elf reincarnation arc, Nozel reconsiders his decision upon witnessing Noelle's progress during the battle with the elves, reconciling with his sister after they battled Kivin. He later enters the Shadow Palace and defeats Patry in his Dark Elf form and helps Asta and Yuno turn Patry back to normal. He later participates in the invasion of the Spade Kingdom and helps Noelle take down Megicula and avenge their mother. He later assists in the battle against Lucifero.

Nebra Silva

 is a royal of House Silva and Noelle's older sister, an overconfident woman who enjoys toying with her opponents while looking down on those she considers inferior. She uses Mist Magic to create illusions of herself and launch water bullets. During the Eye of the Midnight Sun's invasion of the royal capital, she helps her family fight off the zombies before being swept up by spatial magic. During the elf reincarnation arc, she and Solid are helpless against the elf Kivin before Nozel and Noelle arrive. During the Spade Kingdom battle, she stays behind to defend the Clover Kingdom from an ancient demon.

Solid Silva

 is a royal of House Silva and Noelle's second big brother, Solid is a sadistic youth who enjoys insulting those he considers his inferiors, even his own sister Noelle. Since childhood, Solid relentlessly mocks Noelle and merely considers her as a shame of their family. Because of this, Noelle is initially fearful of Solid. Like Noelle, Solid uses Water Magic. During the Eye of the Midnight Sun's invasion of the royal capital, he helps his family fight off the zombies before being swept up by spatial magic. He later takes the Royal Knights selection exam and faces Noelle on opposing teams but she defeats him in a one-on-one battle. He is not accepted into the Royal Knights. During the elf reincarnation arc, he and Nebra are helpless against the elf Kivin before Nozel and Noelle arrive shocked to see Noelle's progress. During the Spade Kingdom battle, he stays behind to defend the Clover Kingdom from an ancient demon.

Green Praying Mantises Squad

Jack the Ripper

 is the Captain of the Green Praying Mantises, a sadist from a family of small game hunters whose bloodlust stems from his teen years when he slayed a giant bear that killed his father. He considers Yami a rival and worthy opponent. Jack uses Severing Magic to create arm blades of mana that can change their properties to match his opponent's magic, allowing him to slash through most magic and once stated to be able to cut through mountains. During the Nean Village arc, he accompanies Nozel and Charlotte to help the Black Bulls fend off the Third Eye. During the elf reincarnation arc, he helps defend the king from the possessed Langris with Yami and Finral. He later enters the Shadow Palace with Yami but gets lost and helps Noelle battle Fana. He later participates in the invasion of the Spade Kingdom and battles Dante with Nacht. He is almost killed until he is saved by Magna and Zora. After Magna defeats Dante, Jack takes him out in respect towards Magna. He also participates in the battle against Lucifero.

Sekke Bronzazza

 is a young womanizer who entered the Magic Knights Entrance Exam for the chance of joining a high-standing Magic Knight Squad, attempting to manipulate Asta whom he considered the worst participant to make himself look good. However, Sekke lost to Asta in the combat test and was only able to be accepted into the Green Praying Mantises, having since bore a grudge on Asta who refers to him by his "Bah-ha" laugh. Sekke uses Bronze Magic to create and manipulate bronze in various ways. After "saving" King Augustus from a possessed Coral Peacock magic knight, he became his personal attendant from that moment on, much to his reluctance as he was simply running away from the chaos the demon caused in the kingdom. He is later tasked by the King to assist the captains in invading the Spade Kingdom.

En Ringard

 is a Magic Knight from the Green Praying Mantises Squad. He uses Fungus Magic, allowing him to generate mushrooms with various effects. He can also attach spores on people to act as communication. Being the oldest of 11 siblings, he is very protective of them and cannot stand Solid's treatment of his sister Noelle. Despite being a rather weak and shy individual, he has shown to act energetic and aggressive, usually by proxy via his talking mushrooms. He was later inducted into the Royal Knights after taking the exam.

Blue Rose Knights Squad
An all-female squad built on the principle that women are superior to men in power.

Charlotte Roselei

 is the Captain of the Blue Rose Knights with the ability to use Briar Magic, allowing her to manipulate thorny rose vines. Charlotte portrays herself as a cold and confident woman with an apparent dislike towards men despite harboring a secret crush on Yami. This is a result of Charlotte suffering a childhood curse that was inflicted on her by her family's enemies, a forbidden spell that activated upon the age of 18 to cause Charlotte's mana to go berserk to kill her and anyone around her. Although the only method to break the curse is by knowing love, Charlotte instead attempted to train herself to enforce control over her magic. However, it resulted in her nearly being killed until Yami risked himself to save her, resulting in her feelings for Yami breaking the curse. Charlotte is too shy to express her feelings to Yami and instead sets up a veil of mockery and self-superiority During the Eye of the Midnight Sun's invasion of the royal capital, she helps Sol battle zombies before they were swept up by spatial magic. During the Nean Village arc, she accompaines Nozel and Jack to help the Black Bulls fend off the Third Eye. During the elf reincarnation arc, she is possessed by the elf spirit , and briefly battles Yami and Sol. Later she travels to the Shadow Palace to help Licht and Yami battle Zagred. In the aftermath of her possession of the elf spirit, Charlotte attempts to express her feelings to Yami with her subordinates' support. She later travels to the Heart Kingdom to train for six months. She later participates in the invasion of the Spade Kingdom and battles Vanica with Rill. She later assists in the battle against Lucifero.

Sol Marron

 is a member of the Blue Rose Knights and is a 3rd Class Intermediate Knight who uses Earth Magic. She joined the Magic Knights after being saved by Charlotte as a child, and as such is very protective of Charlotte and refers to her casually to the latter's dismay. During the Eye of the Midnight Sun's invasion of the royal capital, she helps Charlotte battle the zombies before they are swept up by the spatial magic. She later takes the Royal Knights selection exam but is not accepted into the Royal Knights. She is initially hostile to Yami until she was forced to allow him to deal with the elf spirit possessing Charlotte and has since been tolerant of him. During the Spade Kingdom battle, she stays behind to defend the Clover Kingdom from an ancient demon.

Purple Orcas Squad

Gueldre Poizot

 is the former Captain of the Purple Orcas at the start of the series. Gueldre is a successful merchant who used his Transparency Magic, which renders him invisible and unaffected by magic, to rise up in society by selling top secret magic items and smuggling hazardous materials. He carried out his activities within the Magic Knights, using his captain status to physically intimidate his subordinates. Gueldre's activities are eventually exposed when he is revealed to have enabled the Eye of the Midnight Sun to attack the capital when they offered him wealth for the mage who maintained the capital's barrier. When the Elves begin their assault on the Capital, Gueldre is forced to ally himself with Revchi while attempting to escape in the chaos with the two ending up in the Shadow Palace. He and Revchi were captured by Yami after the battle with Zagred.

Kaiser Granvorka

 is the current Captain of the Purple Orcas following Gueldre's arrest, referred to as the Clover Kingdom's "ultimate shield," due to his mastery of Vortex Magic, which intercepts and disperses his opponent's magic. He would later be revealed to host to an Elf Apostle that Fuegoleon faces in the Shadow Palace which is later exorcised. During the Spade Kingdom battle, he stays behind to defend the Clover Kingdom from an ancient demon.

Revchi Salik

 is a former member of the Purple Orcas and the first antagonist Yuno and Asta encounter at the start of the series, possessing Chain Magic that allows him to nullify any magic. That ability resulted in him being discharged from the Magic Knights after being set up by Gueldre on a failed mission that scarred his face with burns. When Yuno acquires his four-leaf grimoire, Revchi plotted to steal the five-leaf grimoire but he is arrested for his crimes and Asta successfully nullify Revchi's chains. When the Elves begin their assault on the Capital, Revchi attempted to get escape prison and gets revenge on Gueldre before the two realize they both hate Asta for ruining their plans and end up working together to fend off the attacking Elves. He and Gueldre end up going to the Shadow Palace to steal gold and magical items but are captured by Yami after the battle with Zagred.

Xerx Lugner

 is the vice-captain of the Purple Orcas and is an ice mage known as the Saint of Pure Ice. While assumed by many to be virtuous and protective of his squad's honor, he is actually a corrupt Magic Knight who is abusive towards commoners and those weaker than himself. While normally stationed at Clover Kingdom's border, he returns to the capital to take part in the Royal Knight selection exam before being brutally beaten by Zora Ideale for his treatment of a commoner woman. Xerx is later possessed by an elf spirit who attempts to destroy the town of Hecairo before Asta defeats and exorcises the elf.

Aqua Deer Squad

Rill Boismortier

 is the Captain of the Aqua Deers, able to bring what he paints to life and recreate any magic attribute via his Picture Magic. When he received his grimoire, he shut himself away in frustration, struggling to find artistic inspiration, causing destruction during bouts of anger. His butler and friend Walter taught him to acknowledge the feelings of others, encouraged him to share his art, and inspired him to join the Magic Knights. He is the youngest of the Magic Captains, at age 19 – a mere 4 years above Asta and Yuno. He has a casual, laid back attitude befitting his age and enjoys conversing with people closer to his age like Asta, as he has to be overly polite with the other Magic Captains, who are older than him. He becomes friends with Asta after seeing the youth's Anti-Magic and learning of his age. He takes the Royal Knights selection exam and is accepted into the Royal Knights. When Patry conducted the ritual to revive the Elf race, Rill ends up becoming the vessel of the Elf  of the Apostles of the Sephirah. Getting used to his new body and powers, Lira accompanies Patry to Shadow Palace where he holds off Asta and Mimosa before getting on Charmy's bad side and unknowingly awakening her Dwarf heritage. The elf is later exorcised and he develops a crush on Charmy's adult form based on his vague memories of possession (not knowing it was Charmy), and she serves as an inspiration for his art, and thus, his strength. He travels to the Heart Kingdom to train for six months. He later participates in the invasion of the Spade Kingdom and battles Vanica with Charlotte. He later assists in the battle against Lucifero.

Coral Peacocks Squad

Dorothy Unsworth

 is the Captain of the Coral Peacocks, Dorothy is a witch from the Forest of Witches. Always seen sleeping even in a fight, Dorothy is revealed to be a cheery and playful person whose use of Dream Magic allows her to send her opponents into a dream dimension that she can freely manipulate. During the elf reincarnation arc, Dorothy ends up becoming the vessel of the Elf Apostle , who uses her host's powers to send some of the Black Bulls and Sally into the dream dimension. However, the Black Bulls and Sally trick Reve into dreaming up Dorothy, who engages Reve in a metaphysical battle that destroys the dream dimension before the Elf Apostle is defeated in the real world by Luck and Magna. Eve was later exorcised by Asta and in the aftermath of the elf attack on the Clover Kingdom, Dorothy reveals to Noelle the true cause of her mother's death. She later participates in the invasion of the Spade Kingdom and battles Morris until the Black Bulls intervene. She later assists in the battle against Lucifero.

Kirsch Vermillion

 is a nobleman from House Vermillion who uses Cherry Blossom magic, Kirsch is Mimosa's older brother and vice-captain of the Coral Peacocks with the rank of 1st Class Senior Magic Knight. Despite his megalomaniac egotism and obsession for beauty, which Mimosa hates about him as he looks down on people at face value, Kirsch is a capable leader since he handles most of Coral Peacocks' affairs in Dorothy's stead. Following the Royal Knights Selection Exam, Kirsch changed his initial outlook on commoners following his match against Asta. He is accepted into the Royal Knights and helps in the battle against the reincarnated elves. During the Spade Kingdom battle, he stays behind to defend the Clover Kingdom from an ancient demon.

The Underwater Temple
The Underwater Temple is an area under the ocean, in a strong magic region, where the mana force fields are so strong, that the currents prevents even upper-class mages from entering. As such, not many people visit the area, and the people there are very excited to see people from above water. The inhabitants have an alternate appearance as sea creatures. The temple is said to hold one of the magic stones, which are being collected by the Eye of the Midnight Sun, and the Wizard King sends the Black Bulls to retrieve it.

Gifso

The temple's High Priest,  is an old man who is fond of games. When the Black Bulls arrive, he forces the team (except Yami, due to his strength) to play a game with the deal that he will give them the stone if they win it. He even uses this game as a condition to let his grandchildren, Kahono and Kiato, visit the surface. He is the wielder of Game Magic, which allows him to create a dimension for playing grand games with rules set in. However, when the game is in motion, even he cannot enter the dimension or interrupt the game. He gives the magic stone to the Black Bulls after they defeat Vetto.

Gio

Son of the High Priest,  is the strongest magic user in the Underwater Temple. He uses Water Magic. While initially he was facing both Luck and Magna, their battle is interrupted by Vetto, and is immediately defeated.

Kiato

Grandson of the High Priest and Kahono's older brother.  is a user of Dance Magic, allowing him to use powerful sword attacks and make his movements hard to predict with his dances. He has a dream of going above ground to become an idol, forming a Singing/Dancing duo with Kahono. He duels Asta, but they are interrupted by the attack of Vetto. He has his leg amputated by Vetto during their fight, but it is later restored by the Witch Queen's Blood Magic when he and Kahono visit Asta and Noelle at the Star Festival. He has a crush on Noelle after seeing her Water Magic, and calls her "Sea Goddess."

Kahono

 is the lively granddaughter of the High Priest and Kiato's younger sister, possessing a sixth sense along with using her Song Magic for various uses which include offense, healing, and putting the afflicted to sleep. She also has dreams of becoming an idol with her brother, confiding it to Asta and Noelle while helping the latter learn to use her magic effectively. Kahono later served as an opposition to the Black Bulls before helping them fend off Vetto which ended with her throat crushed by him, rendering her unable to use her magic's full potential. Her throat is later healed by the Witch Queen's Blood Magic when she and Kiato were invited to the Star Awards Festival.

Forest of Witches
Witches are allowed to visit the other kingdoms, but must only live in the forest, or they become criminals. Vanessa Enoteca, Dominante Code, Dorothy Unsworth, and Catherine are from the forest, before they fled from the country as fugitives.

Witch Queen

 is the mother of Vanessa and most of the forest's residents, a perfectionist among witches who values power above all else. She can extend her influence across the forest to observe events and her blood can heal others and manipulate them like puppets. Also able to foresee future events, the Queen learns of Vanessa's ability to manipulate fate with her Thread Magic and obsesses over it to the point of inadvertently estranging her daughter by holding her in captivity while forcing her to hone her magic. After the Magic Knights enter the forest to have the queen heal Asta from Vetto's curse, she makes them promise to protect the forest from the Diamond Kingdom and Patry's forces. However, when the Magic Knights fulfill their end of the bargain, she betrays them by tricking Asta into killing his friends against his will, wanting to use him for his Anti-Magic powers. Eventually, she reconsiders once Vanessa awakens her magic, giving the Magic Knights the magic stone in her possession and allowing them to leave while asking Vanessa to come back for occasional visits. She even lends blood to Noelle to heal Kahono and Kiato.

Heart Kingdom
The  is a nation south of the Clover Kingdom whose people adapted to the country's strong natural mana to create unique magic and use a ranking system with Stage Zero at the top. The country has developed a magic technique called . This technique uses runes formed with natural mana to cast "arrays," which give instructions to spells, such as "pursue" or "grow," or focus this natural mana to create the real element. For example, Lightning Magic becomes True Lightning Magic, and creates real lightning. The Heart Kingdom is ruled and protected by a line of queens who use water magic and formed a pact with the water spirit , the current queen being  who entered an alliance with the Clover Kingdom to invade the Spade Kingdom after being inflicted with a curse by Megicula that will kill her within a year's time.

Lolopechka

 is the current Queen of the Heart Kingdom. An airhead at first glance, she is the capable and powerful, and somewhat omniscient, Queen of Heart Kingdom. She is contracted to the Water Spirit Undine, who takes care of Lolopechka physically, mentally, and emotionally. Prior to the Spade Kingdom arc, she was afflicted by the curse of Megicula by Vanica Zogratis, and is set to die one year from the time Asta and the others came to Heart Kingdom for information about Devils. In fear of the Spade Kingdom overrunning the Heart, Diamond, and Clover kingdoms, Lolopechka allies with the Clover Kingdom to create a force strong enough to beat the Spade Kingdom in 6 months time, before her powers weaken. Before the battle, she assigns Noelle and Secre to her squad, as they and Undine will be capable enough to take on Vanica. She battles Vanica with Noelle and Secre but is captured and taken to the Spade Kingdom. She is later freed with the help of Noelle, Asta, Luck, Gadjah, and Nozel. After the Spade Kingdom battle, she resumes her duties as Queen of the Heart Kingdom.

Gadjah

 is one of the Heart Kingdoms Spirit Guardians. He uses lightning magic, and helped train Luck Voltia to use true lightning magic. He battles Hischer and is almost killed but was saved by Patry, Rhya, Vetto, and Fana. He later trains with them and goes to assist in the Spade Kingdom battle.

Spade Kingdom
Originally ruled by House Grinberryall, the Spade Kingdom was taken over by the Zogratis siblings, who subjugated their nation through fear while conquering most of the Diamond Kingdom before invading the other kingdoms. This forces the Clover and Heart Kingdoms to enter an alliance to repel the invaders and restore Ciel Grinberryall to the throne.

House of Grinberryall

Loyce Grinberryall

 is the former king of the Spade Kingdom and Yuno's father, murdered by the Dark Triad when they took over the kingdom. He possessed Sun Magic.

Ciel Grinberryall

 is the queen of the Spade Kingdom and Yuno's mother, who went into hiding after the Dark Triad took over the Spade Kingdom under the protection of loyal citizens who formed a Resistance. She resurfaces once the Dark Triad are defeated and is reunited with Yuno. She possesses Moon Magic.

Ralph Niaflem

 is a former servant of House Grinberryall and member of the Resistance against the Dark Triad.

Allen Fiarain
 is a member of Spade Kingdom's Mage Defense Force and Zenon Zogratis' childhood friend who wields fire magic. He shares many similarities with Asta, including his desire to become Commander in Chief of the Mage Defense Force. He and Zenon both promised each other two reach that goal. During a mission, Allen fought with a devil that had it killed several of his teammates. Zenon took advantage of the distraction and used his magic to kill both Allen and the devil. His death drove Zenon into despair and from then on sought only power at any cost, even his humanity.

Land of the Sun
A land beyond the sea, the Land of the Sun is Yami Sukehiro's homeland and where Asta and Liebe end up after being defeated by Lucius. Unlike the mages of the Clover Kingdom and its neighbors, Hino's mages use scrolls to manifest spells.

Yami Ichika
 is Yami's younger sister and a member of the  a group of seven powerful mages loyal to the Ryudo shougunate. Despite their similarities and ability to use Dark Magic, Ichika hates her brother for killing their family and idolizes Ryuya Ryudo for looking after her.
Despite her reluctance, she helps train Asta on Ryuya's orders. When Sister Lily, Heath Grice, and Yrul invade the Land of the Sun, she battles them with the Ruyzen Seven minus Mushogatake. She battles Yrul but gets caught in his illusions and sees her memories. She realizes from seeing her memories that she was the one who killed her family from taking a pill that was supposed to increase her powers but made her go beserk.

Antagonists

Eye of the Midnight Sun
The  are the main antagonists of the first saga, a group of rogue mages bent on decimating the Clover Kingdom, based at a floating dungeon within the Gravito Rock Zone. Originally based in the Clover Kingdom's Forsaken Region five centuries ago, the Elves were victims of a plot conducted by the demon Zagred who manipulated the ancient Clover Kingdom's envious royals into slaughtering them for their mana so he could possess their leader Licht. Though Licht and Lumiere thwarted the demon's attempt, Zagred manipulated the elves' souls to reincarnate five centuries later in human vessels. Only Patry, one of ten powerful Elf mages known as the Apostles of the Sephirah, is fully reincarnated as he assumed the identity of Licht and established the Eye Of The Midnight Sun to gather the elvish magic stones to place within a sephirah stone slab to invoke a ritual he uses to resurrect his people by transforming their reincarnated bodies into their  so that they can exact their revenge on the Clover Kingdom.

The human members who form the majority of the Midnight Sun are deceived by Patry into joining the organization under the assumption that they are also reincarnated elves and given , unaware that it branded them as sacrificial offerings to activate the ritual, killing them all, with Rades reviving himself, Sally, and Valtos moments later. Once the ritual is finished, Patry is joined by his elf brethren and with most of the Apostles, consisting of himself, the Third Eye, Licht, Ronne, Drowa, Reve, and Lira, and proceeds with the final phase by acquiring the final Magic Stone within the Shadow Palace underneath the Clover Kingdom capital's palace. At the Shadow Palace, the boundary between the living world and the underworld, they can make the elves' reincarnation permanent.

The Elves learn too late about the truth of their demise and resurrection by Zagred, whose reincarnation spell also afflicted them with  that amplified their negative emotions. Once Zagred is defeated, the Magic Knights and the reformed Eye of the Midnight Sun members manage to calm the other elves so they can be allowed to rest in peace.

Patry

 is the leader of the Eye Of The Midnight Sun and of the elves that form the Apostles of the Sephira, having questioned Licht's reasoning for trusting humans before their people were slaughtered. Originally a child in his previous existence, Patry was reincarnated by Zagred within the body of William Vangeance and developed a symbiotic friendship with the human as he used William's resemblance to Licht to assume the leader's identity while establishing the Eye Of The Midnight Sun to revive his fellow reincarnated elves. As Patry cannot use William's grimoire, he acquired a four-leaf clover grimoire to channel his Light Magic for both offense and healing. While Patry hates humans, including his fanatic human subordinates whom he only protects to serve in his plans, he expresses a stronger loathing towards Asta for possessing Licht's grimoire and weapons. During the Saussy Village arc, he sends Heath Grice to get the magic stone, and is reported of the events that took place. During the Eye of the Midnight Sun's invasion of the royal capital, he confronts Fuegoleon and takes the magic stone from him while also cutting off his right arm. He later saves his minions that were caught by Julius while getting injuried in the process. During the Nean Village arc, he gets Valtos to take him to the cave to help Sally when she was defeated by Asta and Gauche. He then injuries Asta, Gauche, and Sister Theresa and tries to kill Asta but Yami stops him. He battles Yami but struggles to the point of trying to use his most powerful spell to kill them. However, the spell is reflected back at him by Gauche. When the sealing magic on him is broken by Asta, he attempts to self-destruct but is stopped by the Third Eye. During the raid of the Eye of the Midnight Sun's hideout, Patry reveals his true identity upon taking full control of William's body as he kills Julius Novachrono for the last of the magic stones needed to activate the sephiroth, sacrificing his human allies to fully revive his fellow apostles and their kin. Patry finds the only opposition to his revenge are the Magic Knights as he leads his forces into the Clover Kingdom to acquire the last stone to cement the elves into their reincarnated vessels while the spell kills off all remaining humans within the Clover Kingdom. He soon learns of Zagred's plot with the revelation over being manipulated by the mastermind behind his peoples' genocide turns him into a Dark Elf, while the demon takes his five-leaf grimoire. Once restored to normal by Asta after being defeated by Nozel, Patry aids the Magic Knights to stop Zagred before having Asta exorcise him so Vangeance can help Licht pacify the other elves so they can pass on. But after his soul gets bounded to Licht’s lifeless vessel, Patry resolves to atone for actions while learning of his peoples’ survival though Licht’s surviving child establishing Elysia in the Heart Kingdom. He later saves Noelle, Secre, Mimosa, Luck, Charmy, Leopold, and Gajdah from being killed in the Heart Kingdom and trains them to master Ultimate Magic. He later goes to the Spade Kingdom to save William.

Heath Grice

 is a time-obsessed mage who uses ice magic. Heath and his disciples attacked a village in the Clover Kingdom's Forsaken region for the magic stone located there. Heath ends up being defeated by Asta, Noelle Silva and Magna Swing, with one of his disciples escaping to report the turn of events to Patry. Heath used a relic to invoke a spell to kill himself and his two disciples in order to prevent the revealing of their agenda along with the Eye of the Midnight Sun's existence during their interrogation. Lucius later uses his siblings' magic to resurrect Heath years after the man's death, altering his soul to serve him as a Paladin.

Valtos

 is a rogue mage who uses Spatial Magic to travel distances. He aids the group in attacking the Royal Capital and played a role in Fuegoleon's mortal injuries. During the Nean Village arc, he brings Patry to the cave where he helps him battle Asta and Yami but is defeated by Asta. He is then rescued by the Third Eye. Valtos later joins the assault on the Black Bulls' base to acquire the magic stone before retrieving Patry, only to be sacrificed, to his shock, for his mana. Valtos, disillusioned from being betrayed, is resurrected by Rades, and they, along with Sally, join forces with the Black Bulls to stop Patry. He later regains his respect for the elf when he redeemed himself. He later goes to assist the Clover Kingdom in the Spade Kingdom battle.

Rades Spirito

 is a necromancer who can animate corpses via his Wraith Magic. His grimoire only has one page but allows him to convert corpses into his personal enforcers, who can use the magic attributes they used in life. Rades was a commoner who joined the Purple Orcas before he was exiled by the Clover Kingdom out of fear of his magic. He later joins the Eye of the Midnight Sun in attacking the Royal Capital and played a role in Fuegoleon's mortal injuries. Rades later joins the assault on the Black Bulls' base to acquire the magic stone before being sacrificed by Patry for his mana. Unbeknownst to Patry, Rades gains a new spell at the last moment that allows him to recall dead souls and resurrect them, returning to life moments after Patry leaves for the Royal Capital. He then resurrects Sally and Valtos and they end up joining forces with the Black Bulls, reluctantly accepting Asta's condition to fight Patry to redeem himself rather than for revenge. In the aftermath of the final battle against the elves, Rades uses his magic to bind Patry's soul to Licht's artificial body, wanting him to atone for his actions. He later goes to assist the Clover Kingdom in the Spade Kingdom battle.

Sally

 is a rogue mage who uses Gel Magic to create and manipulate gelatinous substances. She has an obsession with collecting anything extremely bizarre to study and vivisect, including Asta. She also possesses numerous magic tools that allow her to augment her magic or another's with potential consequences, and she researched creating artificial bodies, which Rhya used to give Vetto and Fana replacement vessels. She participates in the invasion of the royal capital capturing Asta for his anti-magic. She helps battling Julius but is captured then she is saved by Patry. During the Nean Village arc, she hires Baro and Neige to drain the mana of children. She comes to help when Baro sends a message but suffers injuries in her battle against Asta and Gauche. She is later sent back to their hideout by Patry and Valtos. Following her role in the assault on the Black Bulls' base to acquire the magic stone there, Sally ends up being sacrificed by Patry for her mana. Sally is resurrected by Rades, and they, along with Valtos, join forces with the Black Bulls to stop Patry, though she only accepted after Asta promised himself as her test subject and to atone for her crimes. She helps some of the Black Bulls during their fight against the elf Reve by deducing the nature of the magic used by the elf's host Dorothy Unsworth and using it to their advantage. Sally later joins the Clover Kingdom’s Magic Tool Research Lab to aid in the conflict against with the Spade Kingdom. She later goes to assist the Clover Kingdom in the Spade Kingdom battle.

Catherine

 is a rogue witch who is utterly vain and used her Ash Magic to drain the mana of others to maintain her youthful beauty, making herself physically the oldest of Patry's subordinates. Catherine made her appearance known in the Royal Capital during her group's attack, attacking the citizens before being stopped by Yuno who forced her to exhaust all of her mana to withstand his attack and then knocked out by Charmy, who misunderstood Catherine's need to feed on her mana to restore her youth as an attempt to steal her food. Catherine is later placed in custody alongside another member named Geork, the enchantment placed on their minds to prevent them from divulging information broken by Asta as they are forced to reveal Gueldre's role in their attack on the Capital. She later dies as the result of Patry's ritual.

Third Eye
While initially presented as the Midnight Sun's strongest members, they are revealed to be humans possessed by three members of the Apostles of Sephira. Their titles play on being embodiments of the opposing traits depicted on Clover Kingdom's clover coat of arms: faith, hope and love. Once their leader Patry commenced the plan to resurrect their kin, the Third Eye members take their place with the other Apostles to complete the spell. Following the defeat of the demon that manipulated their people, the Third Eye remain among the living while their kin depart to the afterlife since the bodies they are using at the time were originally soulless. They decide to spend their remaining time in life atoning for their actions.

An Elf Apostle given the title of  who is able to sense all forms of deception, supporting Patry's plan despite knowing there was more to the story of their slaughter by the humans than how it appeared. His Copy Magic allows him to copy any type of magic and assume another's appearance. During the Nean Village arc, he comes to help Patry and Valtos when they are defeated and battles Charlotte. He helps to stop Patry from self-destructing. He used his magic to impersonate William for a Magic Knight Captains' meeting since the real William was recuperating from the damage inflicted on his body while it was used by Patry during his fight against Yami and Asta. During the Royal Knights' attack on the Midnight Sun's base, Rhya attempts to infiltrate Mereoleona Vermillion's team as Asta. But he ends up being overpowered by Mereoleona when his ruse is quickly exposed, becoming a complete Elf once Patry began the ritual as he later retrieves his reconstituted Third Eye comrades to meet up with Patry and the other Apostles to complete the spell. While facing Yuno, Rhya realizes the figure that he and Patry assumed was their comrade Ronne is the true cause of their peoples' slaughter as he is wounded by him. After Zagred is defeated, due to having reincarnated twice he is unable to return to his original body and gives a farewell to Licht. He later saves Noelle, Secre, Mimosa, Luck, Charmy, Leopold, and Gajdah from being killed in the Heart Kingdom and trains them to master Ultimate Magic.

While initially able to use his rare Beast Magic ability to boost his physical prowess while generating an animal-shaped aura, he can enhance it into Mythical Beast Magic by manifesting a third eye. This increases his power and allows him to regenerate severed limbs while turning him into a monster and curse people. During the Nean Village arc, he comes to help Patry and Valtos when they are defeated and battles Jack. He helps to stop Patry from self-destructing. He later battles with the Black Bulls at the Sea Temple while crippling Kahono and her brother when leading an assault to acquire the Magic Stone within the temple, exhausting himself in his fight against Asta despite managing to break both the youth's arms. Vetto is killed by Yami when he attempts to self destruct, and his body was taken by Julius Novachrono to be autopsied in order to research Demon magic. When the elves are reincarnated, Vetto is reincarnated by Rhya into a younger, 15-year-old artificial body that Sally developed when the other elves reincarnate. Vetto accompanies Patry to the Shadow Palace where he holds off Mereoleona. After Zagred is defeated, due to having reincarnated twice he is unable to return to his original body and gives a farewell to Licht. He later saves Noelle, Secre, Mimosa, Luck, Charmy, Leopold, and Gajdah from being killed in the Heart Kingdom and trains them to master Ultimate Magic.

The human Fana is a denizen of the Diamond Kingdom and Mars' childhood friend when they were being experimented on, nearly killing herself in forcing Mars to attack her for his freedom. While Mars assumed he killed her, Fana was subjected to further experimentation in secret while her Fire Magic was augmented with Crystals as the result of pages from Mars' Grimoire grafted into her book. The human Fana was discarded and found by Patry, awakening Fana who subverts her host while acquiring her human counterpart's magic and the Spirit of Fire, Salamander. During the Nean Village arc, she comes to help Patry and Valtos when they are defeated and battles Nozel. She helps to stop Patry from self-destructing. During the Forest of Witches arc, she comes to take the magic stone from there as well as get revenge on the Black Bulls but the human Fana eventually manifests herself during the Third Eye member's confrontation with Asta and Mars. Mars managed to purge the elf spirit after she attempted to self-destruct when Fana began to take back her body. While the human Fana goes into hiding within the Clover Kingdom until Mars succeeds in his coup, the Elf Fana is transferred by Rhya into a younger, 15-year-old artificial body that Sally developed when the other elves reincarnate. Fana accompanies Patry to the Shadow Palace where she holds off Noelle and Jack the Ripper. After Zagred is defeated, due to having reincarnated twice she is unable to return to her original body and gives a farewell to Licht. She later saves Noelle, Secre, Mimosa, Luck, Charmy, Leopold, and Gajdah from being killed in the Heart Kingdom and trains them to master Ultimate Magic.

Diamond Kingdom
While its territory expansion placed it in odds with the Clover Kingdom, the Diamond Kingdom ended up being mostly conquered by the Spade Kingdom.

Morris Libardirt

 is a Magic Scholar who was born blind as the result of being host to a Devil, his Modification Magic enabling him to alter the structure of physical and magical objects. Morris used his position to control the king of the Diamond Kingdom, orchestrating numerous experiments on children to strengthen the power of the kingdom’s magic knights while discarding those who have failed to meet his expectations. Following Kiten's failed invasion, Morris sends Mars and Ladros to the Witch's Forest to kidnap the Witch Queen so he can learn the secret of her longevity. But it resulted in his exile when Mars removed him from power by using the Queen's blood to make the king a puppet. Morris ends up at the Spade Kingdom and provides his knowledge and technology to the Dark Triad, contributing to their plan to create a Tree of Qliphoth. He becomes Lucifero’s host while further enhanced himself with Lolopechka’s inherited knowledge to accelerate the Qliphoth Advent Ritual, modifying it to be dependent on himself, Yami, and Vangeance instead of the Dark Triad as they are defeated. However, Morris ends up being defeated by the Black Bulls with Lucifero sacrificing his life to open the Qliphoth’s second gate. Lucius later resurrects Morris months later using his siblings' magic to recreate his body, curing his blindness and altering his soul to serve him.

Lotus Whomalt

Prior to the events of the series, Lotus had encounters with Julius Novachrono and Yami Sukehiro with the latter having scarred his chest. While facing Luck during his mission to investigate a dungeon alongside Mars, Lotus managed to secure a hefty amount of treasures for his Kingdom. During the Kiten arc, he tries to attack William but is stopped by Yami and retreats. Lotus is later forced into aligning himself with the Spade Kingdom following the exile of Morris, only to turn on Morris after he formed a pact with Lucifero.

Mars

 is one of the Diamond Kingdom's Eight Shining Generals, Mars was raised as a weapon alongside Fana as the two were experimented on along with various others by Morris. Mars was emotionally scarred when forced by Fana to kill her for his freedom, gaining access to her Fire Magic along with his natural Crystal magic after pages of their grimoires were ripped and transplanted into each other. But when he was to acquire a dungeon's treasure before the Clover Kingdom, Mars battled Asta and the friendship that resulted convinces him to change the Diamond Kingdom's internal structure for the better. Mars later plays a role in saving Fana upon learning of her survival and being possessed by an elf after Morris discarded her, using a vial of the Witch Queen's blood to place the Diamond Kingdom’s king under his control and evict Morris from their homeland.

Ladros

 is one of the Diamond Kingdom's Eight Shining Generals and a former apprentice of Fanzell, born with the ability to use magic yet lacked an attribute to give it form compared to others. This have him a complex that worsened after his forced reconstructive surgery gave him the ability to absorb and emit mana, intending to use everyone to rise up the ranks and eliminate potential threats like Mars. Following the attack on the Forest of Witches, Ladros turns over a new leaf after being defeated by Asta and offers to aid Mars in his plan to change the Diamond Kingdom's internal structure for the better.

Broccos

 is one of the Diamond Kingdom's Eight Shining Generals who uses magic to manipulate red ochre as a weapon. He is very impatient and angry and enjoys fighting in a reckless and straightforward manner, though he is shown to be protective of the men under his command. During the attack on Kiten he attempts to duel with Squad Captain William Vangeance but is easily defeated and immobilized. He is rescued by Lotus Whomalt as the Diamond Kingdom retreated.

Ragus

 is one of the Diamond Kingdoms's Eight Shining Generals who uses Lightning Magic. During the attack on Kiten he succeeds in breaking through the magical shield surrounding the city with powerful lightning arrows. He is impaled by Yuno's wind trident which throws him into a building.

Yagos

 is one of the Diamond Kingdom's Eight Shining Generals whose use of Mucus Magic allows him to drain mana from his opponents. He is among the generals sent to attack Kiten before losing his right arm to Langris Vaude and being captured by the Black Bulls.

Dark Triad
 are a group of three sibling mages from the Zogratis family who overthrew House Grinberryall and subjugated the Spade Kingdom through fear while conquering most of the Diamond Kingdom before invading the other kingdoms. This forces the Clover and Heart Kingdoms to enter an alliance to repel the invaders and exterminate Megicula. The tree requires World Tree Magic and Dark Magic to grow, with the Dark Triad targeting William and Yami for that purpose. Following the Dark Triad’s defeat, it is revealed their older brother Lucius infiltrated the Clover Kingdom years ago. Retrieving their bodies and grimoires, Lucius uses his siblings' combined magic attributes to recreate Moris's body.

 The leader of the Dark Triad and host of the devil Lucifero. He has the ability to use both Lucifero's Gravity Magic, allowing him to manipulate the gravity of himself, others, and other objects, and his own Body Magic, allowing him to control his body's tissues and functions to heal and undergo monstrous transformations. He is an arrogant sociopath who believes evil to be humanity's true nature, leading the coup on the Spade Kingdom out of a sense of dissatisfaction in his past achievements as a soldier. Dante later travels to the Black Bulls' hideout in hopes of capturing Yami to use his dark magic to create a Tree of Qliphoth, overpowering the Blacks Bulls before being wounded by Asta using Yami's katana after the youth offered his right arm to Liebe for more power. Rescued by Zenon and enhanced by Morris, Dante overwhelms Nacht and Jack in the ensuing conflict before engaging Magna in a one-on-one fist fight that gradually exhausts both their magic. Dante loses his connection to Lucifero as a consequence while knocked out by Magna, losing control over his remaining magic upon regaining consciousness before Jack takes him out in respect towards Magna.

 A member of the Dark Triad with a cross-shaped mark on the left side of his forehead who is the host of the devil Beelzebub, his vast amount of mana allows him to single-handedly subdue the Diamond Kingdom alone. He has the ability to use Beelzebub’s Spatial Magic, allowing him to create portals and dimensional spaces that control mana, and his own Bone Magic, allowing him to manipulate and create bones. The youngest of the Zogratis siblings, Zenon initially was kind-hearted with no interest in becoming a Devil Host until he was forced to kill his childhood friend and rival Allen to stop a devil they encountered in a dungeon as members of the Mage Defense Force. The traumatic ordeal made Zenon cold and cynical as he saw emotions as meaningless, only showing sadistic joy when mercilessly defeating opponents. Zenon later leads the attack on the Golden Dawn base with two of his disciples to capture William for his group's goals of using William's World Tree Magic in creating a Tree of Qliphoth, easily defeating Yuno and a large number of members in the process, killing half of them. He teleports to Dante after he was defeated by Asta where he captures Yami and leaves with both him and William as well as his unconscious brother Dante through a portal back towards the Spade Kingdom. While facing Yuno as the first gate to the underworld opens, Zenon sacrifices his humanity to Beelzebub for a Devil's heart after being impaled by Yuno's Spirit of Euros spell. Zenon overpowers Yuno before he acquires his second grimoire and destroys his demon heart. As he dies, he realizes the similarities between Yuno and himself and how their paths differed. 

A member of the Dark Triad who wears an eyepatch with the Spade Kingdom insignia and is the host of the devil Megicula, whose power she used to kill Noelle's mother Acier and later placed a lethal curse on Lolopechka. She has the ability to use both Megicula's Curse-Warding Magic, allowing her to cast powerful curses with various effects, and her own Blood Magic, allowing her to create and manipulate blood. She is enthusiastic and hedonistic, seeking to fight powerful opponents and release devils into the human world for her own enjoyment. Vanica attacks the Heart Kingdom with five of her disciples to incite Lolopechka into a death match, with four of her disciples defeating four of the Spirit Guardians, the strongest mages in the Heart Kingdom, while she splits control of her body with Megicula to defeat Lolopechka, Noelle, and Secre. She becomes intrigued by Noelle, and kidnaps Lolopechka instead of killing her, to incite Noelle to be stronger in their next fight where she can use Megicula’s full power. Though she accepts her demise at Noelle’s hands after being defeated, Vanica finds herself instead being placed under Megicula’s control as the devil reveals her intention of sacrifice her host to fully manifest. However, Megicula is killed before the sacrifice is completed, but Vanica is left in a half-dead state.

Dark Disciples

One of the Dark Disciples who accompanies Zenon during the attack on the Golden Dawn base. He uses Stone Magic, which he uses to create stone fists. Due to the demon's power, his stone is harder than iron or steel and can resist multiple simultaneous attacks without taking damage. He is defeated by Yuno after a tough fight.

One of the Dark Disciples who accompanies Zenon during the attack on the Golden Dawn base. He uses Mist Magic, which he uses to create illusions of himself to confuse his opponents. Due to the demon's power, he can condense his mist into water projectiles strong enough to destroy steel. He is defeated by Klaus with the help of Letoile Becquerel.

 One of the Dark Disciples who accompanies Vanica during the attack on the Heart Kingdom. He uses Skin Magic, which he uses to manipulate his skin and its properties. Due to Megicula's power, his skin can nullify magic attacks by becoming softer or harder. He battles Luck, and is later killed when Vanica detonates the devil power she gave her disciples, turning them into bombs as a final attack on the Heart Kingdom.

 One of the Dark Disciples who accompanies Vanica during the attack on the Heart Kingdom. He uses Eyeball Magic, which he uses to create and control eyeballs which detect people's strength, stamina, magic, and movements. Due to Megicula's power, he can use this information to predict his opponent's next move, and snipes them with a magic bullet from a distance. He battles Leopold, and is later killed when Vanica detonates the devil power she gave her disciples, turning them into bombs as a final attack on the Heart Kingdom.

 One of the Dark Disciples who accompanies Vanica during the attack on the Heart Kingdom. She uses Hair Magic, which she uses to grow and control her hair. Due to Megicula's power, her hair is tough, infinitely growing, and free-moving. She battles Charmy, and is later killed when Vanica detonates the devil power she gave her disciples, turning them into bombs as a final attack on the Heart Kingdom.

 One of the Dark Disciples who accompanies Vanica during the attack Heart Kingdom. He uses Nail Magic, which he uses to lengthen and sharpen his nails. Due to Megicula's power, his nails are able to get even longer and become as sharp as daggers. He battles Gadjah, and is later killed when Vanica detonates the devil power she gave her disciples, turning them into bombs as a final attack on the Heart Kingdom.

 One of the Dark Disciples who accompanies Vanica during the attack Heart Kingdom. He uses Tongue Magic, which he uses to enlarge and harden his tongue. Due to Megicula's power, his tongue is able to get enlarged, lengthened, and immensely hardened. He battles Mimosa, and is later killed when Vanica detonates the devil power she gave her disciples, turning them into bombs as a final attack on the Heart Kingdom.

Lucius Zogratis
 is the eldest sibling of the Dark Triad, a mage born with two souls with the other soul being Julius Novachrono. He is affiliated with Astaroth, the devil of Time Magic, while his innate magic, Soul Magic, allows him to alter the nature of a person's soul via touch like inverting a Devil's soul into an purified one. A megalomaniac who believes himself to be a savior, Lucius sacrificed his siblings to achieve his goal to incarnate purified devils into humans to create a new immortal race called  and become the final Wizard King of a world utopia. He is initially shown as a shadowy and faceless figure in a wheelchair, but it is revealed that he infiltrated the Clover Kingdom and allowed the unaware Julius free reign to maintain his cover. Following the conclusion of the Clover and Heart Kingdoms' fight against the Dark Triad, Lucius is forced to reveal himself to incapacitate Damnatio when he confronted Julius about his ability to use Time Magic. Adrammelech appears shortly afterwards carrying Lucifero's heart as Lucius travels to the underworld to devour the heart of Lucifero's remaining half, gaining the devil's Gravity Magic. He also gains the powers of the rest of the devils in the underworld. Lucius returns to Clover Kingdom a year later to carry out his plan once he kills Asta, deeming him a flaw that cannot be allowed to live in his perfect world. After he seemingly killed Asta while taking Lily as the first of his Paladins, he considers Yuno as his next target while informing everyone present that his judgement will commence within seven days. After recruiting Yrul along with the revived Heath Grice and Morris to his cause, Lucius sends the former two and Lily to Hino to dispatch Asta.

Devils
The , or demons, are monstrous beings from the  whose only amusement comes from tormenting each other and other races from the living world. Devils tend to manifest within the living world during strange occurrences, usually by forming pacts with mages who become  though they are occasions where a devil can bring its body to the living world.

The first devil that Asta physically encounters, Zagred possesses Word Soul Magic, which allows him to manipulate himself and his surroundings through speech, and Reincarnation Magic, which lets him manipulate a dying soul and place it in another body. Having discarded his body to enter the mortal realm as a body possessing spirit, Zagred masterminded the Elves' genocide five centuries ago in a scheme to possess Licht's body and use the elf's five-leaf grimoire. Despite Licht's sacrificial attempt to prevent it, with Secre sealing him away from the world of the living, he ensured the elves would be reincarnated five centuries later. While Patry intends to make the elves' reincarnation permanent, Zagred manipulates Patry into bringing his body to the living world. Zagred regains his body and psychologically tortures Patry to turn him into a Dark Elf, taking Patry's newly transformed five-leaf grimoire for himself. He battles Asta, Yuno, Yami, Charla, and the restored Patry, Licht, Lumiere, and Secre, and is ultimately destroyed by Asta, who slices his heart in half. He is mocked by Liebe before disintegrating.

The King of Devils who made his home in the Spade Kingdom within the body of the Dark Triad leader Dante, his Gravity Magic allowing him to freely manipulate the gravity of himself, others, and other objects. He can also possess low-ranking Devils. Prior to the events of the series, Lucifero attempts to possess the body of Liebe when the rogue devil ended up in the living world and fatally wounded Licita when she thwarted his attempt. Lucifero abandons Dante following his defeat and forms a pact with Morris to hasten the Qliphoth in order to fully emerge, an act that would destroy the world. When Morris is easily defeated by the Black Bulls, Lucifer sacrifices his host to open the second gate and possesses the emerging demons to create a rudimentary body to fight the Magic Knights. Though his monstrous form is restrained by the Black Bulls and destroyed by Asta, Lucifero manages to partially manifest half of himself in the living world and resolves to kill Magic Knights and every other human in his current state after acknowledging them to be capable of harming him. Though he defeats nearly everyone present, including Yuno and most of the captains, Asta achieves a more complete Devil Union and manages to defeat Lucifero, only for the devil’s heart to be ripped from his body by Adrammelech and delivered to Lucius Zogratis. Lucis later travels to the underworld and kills off the remaining half of Lucifero, devouring his heart soon after.

One of the three highest ranking devils that left the underworld years ago and currently resides in the body of Lucius Zogratis, possessing Time Magic.

One of the three highest ranking devils that made its home in the Spade Kingdom, his Spatial Magic allowing him to create portals and dimensional spaces that control mana. Initially residing in the body of Zenon Zogratis, Beelzebub is later purified by Lucius and placed within the body of Lily Aquaria.

A devil that substitutes for Astaroth and made her home in the Spade Kingdom within the body Vanica Zogratis, Megicula is the source of all curse-based magic in the living world via her , a power potent enough that whoever mentions the entity without protection is cursed. Prior to the events of the series, Megicula formed a pact with the Agrippa family to grant them curse magic and later killed Acier Silva at Vanica’s request, the latter act revealed to be part of Megicula's plan to fully manifest through a ritual known as  where she is required to kill three powerful mages of the same sex. The ritual also allows Megicula acquire Acier's soul and magic for her own use. Megicula targets Princess Lolopechka as her second sacrifice, inflicting her with a death curse which led to the Clover and Heart Kingdoms entering an alliance to vanquish her. Megicula partially manifests from Vanica's body when she is defeated by Noelle, revealing her host as the final sacrifice before proceeding to overpower Noelle's group. But Megicula gets confused over Noelle's insistence that humanity's true strength is their determination as Rill, Charlotte, and Gaja revive to battle Megicula's reanimated soldiers. Accompanying Luck and Asta with the latter saving Lolopechka, Nozel damages Megicula's body enough for Noelle to destroy the devil's heart and free their mother's soul. Megicula disintegrates while accepting that she was wrong about the strength of humans.

  and 
The twin Supreme devils residing in the first level of the underworld, fully manifesting in the living world when the Tree of Qliphoth is established. Superior to the Dark Triad in power, Lilith uses Devil Ice Magic while Naamah uses Devil Fire Magic. They also have the ability to merge into a stronger form able to create freezing suns. The two are first to emerge once the gate to the underworld is opened, nearly killing Nacht when he challenges them before Asta intervenes. After Asta dealt a near fatal blow to Naamah, the two devils then assume their fused form to confront the human. As he continues to bypass their combined attacks with ease, the two grow increasingly uneasy as Liebe tells them that they are beginning to experience fear towards him. They are then restrained by Nacht, allowing Asta to kill them.

The four mid-level devils residing in the body of Nacht Faust, the vice-captain of the Black Bulls. Through the use of Nacht's shadows, they can manifest as familiars or larger, more imposing forms wearing animal masks. Gimodelo wears a dog mask; Devil Union with him grants Nacht the characteristic "Pack", giving him the ability to create humanoid dog creatures from his shadow. Slotos wears a donkey mask; Devil Union with him grants Nacht the characteristic "Toughness", giving him immense physical strength and endurance. Plumede wears a cat mask; Devil Union with him grants Nacht the characteristic "Agility", giving him great speed and evasiveness. Walgner wears a rooster mask; Devil Union with him grants Nacht the characteristic “Call”, giving the ability to emit sound waves that can stun enemies.

The highest ranking Supreme devil from the second level of the underworld. He is very apathetic, harboring no particular malice or hatred for humans, and refusing to fight on Lucifero's behalf simply for his own enjoyment. It was only after Lucifero is defeated that Adrammelech rips out the demon’s heart and flies off, later appearing before Lucius Zogratis to present the heart to him.

Other characters

Father Orsi 

Father  is the Priest of the Church in Hage Village who also runs the orphanage where Asta and Yuno grew up. He treats both boys as his foster sons along with every other orphan under his care. He leans towards being overdramatic in expressing his fatherly feelings for Yuno and Asta after they leave the orphanage, frequently rushing to hug them only to fall flat on his face after they dodge out of the way. He is able to cast Fire Magic and operate a flying broomstick.

Sister Lily 

Sister  is a young Nun and caretaker of the Church in Hage Village who helped raise Asta and Yuno from the time they were young boys. She has a kind demeanor that can turn serious when required. Asta has had a crush on her since they first met with Lily constantly turning down his marriage proposals before he ceases his romantic pursuit after asking for her hand in marriage for the last time once he was old enough to legally marry. She possesses a high level of skill in Water Magic, most often demonstrated when she punishes Asta by summoning giant water fists to squash him into the ground. Lucius used his Soul Magic to turn her into the first of Paladins, granting her Spatial Magic by making her host to a purified Beelzebub.

Rebecca Scarlet 

 is a young red-haired woman who takes care of her five younger siblings to the point that most mistakenly assume she is their mother. Rebecca first meets Asta when forced by her friends to participate in a group date, gradually warming up to him upon realizing they have a lot in common. It bloomed into a crush after Asta defends her from a drunken bully, though Rebecca eventually decides not to proceed with it after noticing Noelle's feelings despite kissing him on the cheek after he saved her siblings.

Sister Theresa Rapual 

Sister  is an elderly nun and former Magic Knight of the Crimson Lions who wears a nun's habit and has a long jagged scar over her left eye extending from her forehead to the middle of her cheek. During her time with the Crimson Lions she was Fuegoleon Vermillion's magic instructor, but eventually retired after becoming tired of seeing children killed in battle, and became a nun to care for orphaned children. She looks after Marie Adlai, Gauche Adlai's younger sister, and prevents him from seeing Marie more than once a month due to his obsessive behaviour. She participates in the fight to rescue the children of Nean Village from Baro and Neige, proving that she is still a force to be reckoned with despite her advanced age. After she is injured in the fighting Gauche starts treating her with more respect. After she recovers she resumes her duties caring for her orphans.

Marie Adlai 

 is Gauche's little sister whom he adored enough to become a criminal for after they were kicked out of their family estate to provide for her. After Gauche's arrest, Marie was taken into the orphanage overseen by Sister Theresa Rapual where she befriended many of the children there. Later she was kidnapped along with the rest of the children from Nean Village by Neige and Baro. She was later saved by Asta, Gauche, and Sister Theresa. When Gauche tries to take her back to the village, she convinces him to go back and help the others. She is later taken back to the village by Finral. When Patry reincarnates the elves, Marie is possessed by the elf  who possesses Eye Magic that allows her to use spells without need of a grimoire. Marie returns to normal after Asta exorcises the elf spirit from her body.

Neige 

 is a rogue mage and younger brother of Baro who can use Snow Magic, helping Baro kidnap children out of fear of making him angry. Neige's other reason is his obsessive desire for friends, lashing out at Marie when she denounces kidnapping as a way of befriending others. During the battle against the Magic Knights when they go to rescue the children, Neige is saved from Baro's mud monster form by Asta so he can take responsibility for his crimes. Neige saves Asta by freezing Baro solid and vowing revenge on Sally and the Eye of the Midnight Sun for making Baro a monster. After Asta says he would happily be his friend as he allows himself to be arrested, his repentant mindset is noted as he is sentenced to community service at Sister Theresa's church.

Baro 

 is a dark-haired mage who possesses Mud Magic and spectacles to measure a person's mana. A low-level thug hired by Sally to collect mana by stealing it from children. During his attempt to drain mana from the children of Nean Village, which included the siblings of Rebecca Scarlet and Gauche Adlai's sister, he requested Sally's help after being defeated and tied up. While Baro intended to quickly flee the moment he is freed, he ends up being subjected to Sally's Reverse Magic Tool which causes him to be consumed by his magic and turned into a giant monster. He is defeated by Asta, Gauche and Sister Theresa with his remains frozen solid by Neige.

Fanzell Kruger 

 is a 28–year old Wind Magic user, swordsman and a former commander of the Diamond Kingdom's army. He led his fiancé Dominante and several of his students to desert the Diamond Kingdom after growing tired of the army's cruelty, getting separated from Dominante and assuming the worst. But after Fanzell trained Asta in swordsmanship after the youth got his grimoire, he eventually reunites with Dominante and the two keep a quiet profile in the Clover Kingdom. He helps Asta during the Forest of Witches incident, reuniting with Mars and Fana as he takes the latter under his protection.

Dominante Code 

, originally from the Forest of Witches, formerly served the Diamond Kingdom. Her fiancé Fanzell mentioned her exceptional skill at crafting magical tools such as wands, flying broomsticks, and even invisibility cloaks. Dominante deserted the Diamond Kingdom alongside Fanzell as they fled into the Clover Kingdom. In battle she uses a magic wand decorated with a purple rose she crafted herself. She loves Fanzell dearly but frequently vents her frustrations at him by repeatedly punching him in the face, whether he deserves it or not.

Mariella 

 is an Ice Magic user and former student of Fanzell who is a ruthless assassin, having feigned deserting the Diamond Kingdom to retrieve Fanzell and assassinate any other deserters. When she meets Asta she admits that she is also wary of the Diamond Kingdom, becoming an official deserter when she helps the Black Bulls defeat her fellow assassins, and later lives with Fanzell and Dominante to atone for her past crimes by helping others.

Licht 

The leader of the Elves who possesses Sword Magic,  is the previous owner of the Five-Leaf Clover Grimoire currently possessed by Asta. Licht expressed a desire for his people to co-exist with humans and befriended Lumiere while falling in love with the human's sister Tetia. After Licht and Tetia conceived twin half-elf children, they married with the elves present. But Zagred arranged for Tetia's family and the human royals to attack at that moment with Licht watching his people get slaughtered along with one of his children when his wife was mortally wounded in the attack. After his Grimoire transformed into a five-leaf clover grimoire, Licht struggles to keep Zagred from possessing him before using the magic stones to turn himself into a mindless monster to prevent his possession. Lumiere is then forced to kill his friend to stop his rampage after extracting the elf's mana. Licht was reduced to a skeleton littering the area Hage Village would be built on, while being demonized by the Clover Kingdom's stories of the event. Tetra and Licht’s surviving child would flee in the aftermath to the Heart Kingdom where their descendants flourished in Elysia village.
While Patry assumed Licht's identity after reincarnating into the body of William Vangeance five centuries later, he has Sally create an artificial body for Licht's soul to inhabit once all the Elves have been fully revived. But the effects of Licht’s monstrous transformation render his soul mostly asleep by the time he is revived, his actions driven only by instinct. He then battles Asta and Yuno in the Eye of the Midnight Sun's hideout and defeats them. While indifferent to Asta possessing his grimoire and swords, Licht takes back the Demon-Dweller Sword and accompanies Rhya to Clover Castle where he proceeds to fight Zagred with Yami and Charla. Secre later unseals his soul to restore his true personality and strength, allowing him to fight by Lumiere’s side. Once Zagred is defeated and the elf souls are allowed to pass on, Licht decides to join his people in the afterlife while his artificial body is used by Rades to keep Patry among the living.

Licita 

The biological mother of Asta and Liebe's foster mother,  left Asta at the church door as a baby, worried that she would absorb her son's magic and life force. While her body steals magic and life force, her magic stores objects without mana into other objects. Licita comes across Liebe, who is immune to her absorption, due to being a devil and not having any magic. She adopts Liebe and gives him his name, living happily with him. Eventually, Lucifero partially takes over Liebe's body, and Licita uses her magic-absorption to drive him out, at the cost of her life. Before dying, she uses her magic to store Liebe in the five-leaf grimoire, to protect him from Lucifero and to grow up safely.

Dryad 
 is the guardian deity of Elysia near the heart kingdom where the surviving elves now live. She has the ability to see the near future and helps teach Noelle and the others how to use ultimate magic before their battle with devils.

Morgen Faust 
 was the twin brother of Nacht, who was kind in contrast to Nacht's selfishness. Morgen joins the Gray Deer Magic Knight squad and befriends Yami, failing to convince Nacht to join. Morgen discovers his family's association with devils, but doesn't intervene until Nacht attempts to contract with a supreme devil. He destroys the artifact connecting Nacht and the devil, and before dying, reveals to his brother that he simply wanted them to protect people together, regardless of their differences.

References

Black Clover